= Timable =

Chinese Event List Website

- Available in: Traditional Chinese、Simplified Chinese、English
- Headquarters: Hong Kong
- Founder: Sam Yuen
- Website: timable.com
- Launched: 14 July 2010

Timable is an online event listing platform in Hong Kong, consisting of websites and mobile apps. It was co-founded by Sam Yuen and Mike Ko in 2010. It displays popular events happening in the city, including concerts, dramas, exhibitions, festivals, events for family, etc. The name refers to its attempt to create a platform that allows users to search by time. Users can search for events, matching their spare time.

Timable, an original word, means "able to time" according to the explanation on its website. The letter "e" is omitted in the word based on common English grammar, like "scalable", "writable". The name is often misspelled as "timeable" or "timetable". At the moment, there is no corresponding Chinese name for Timable.

Listings are contributed by event organizers in Web 2.0 approach, or published by Timable Editors. By the end of 2013, over 23,000 events have been recorded.

== History ==
- 2010-07-11: Launch of Facebook page
- 2010-07-14: Official launch of Timable.com
- 2010–2009: Launch of mobile website
- 2011–2012: Joined Cyberport incubation programme
- 2012–2004: Timable co-operates with Yahoo! Hong Kong and launches "Timable on Yahoo!"
- 2012-08-31: Release of iPhone iOS app
- 2013-10-13: Release of Android app

== Awards ==
- 2010: Awarded Cyberport Creative Micro Fund (CCMF)
- 2011: 2011 Top 10 .hk Website Competition – Merit Prize in SME Group
- 2013-04-08: Hong Kong ICT Awards 2013 – Best Mobile Apps (Mobile Marketing) Silver Award

== Media coverage ==
- 2011-03-03: Article by Samson Tam – published on local newspaper Sing Tao Daily and website hksilicon.com
- 2012-01-29: Interview by Asia Television (www.hkatv.com)
- 2012-06-06: Interview by One Media Trading Express
- 2012-10-22: Interview by STHeadline
- 2013-03-25: Report by TVB Weekly
- 2013-08-05: Interview by Apple Daily
- 2013-08-07: Interview by Hong Kong Economic Times
- 2013-11-14: Report by STHeadline
- 2013-12-27: Interview by i-CABLE News Channel
