= Leme, Rio de Janeiro =

Leme
- Neighborhood
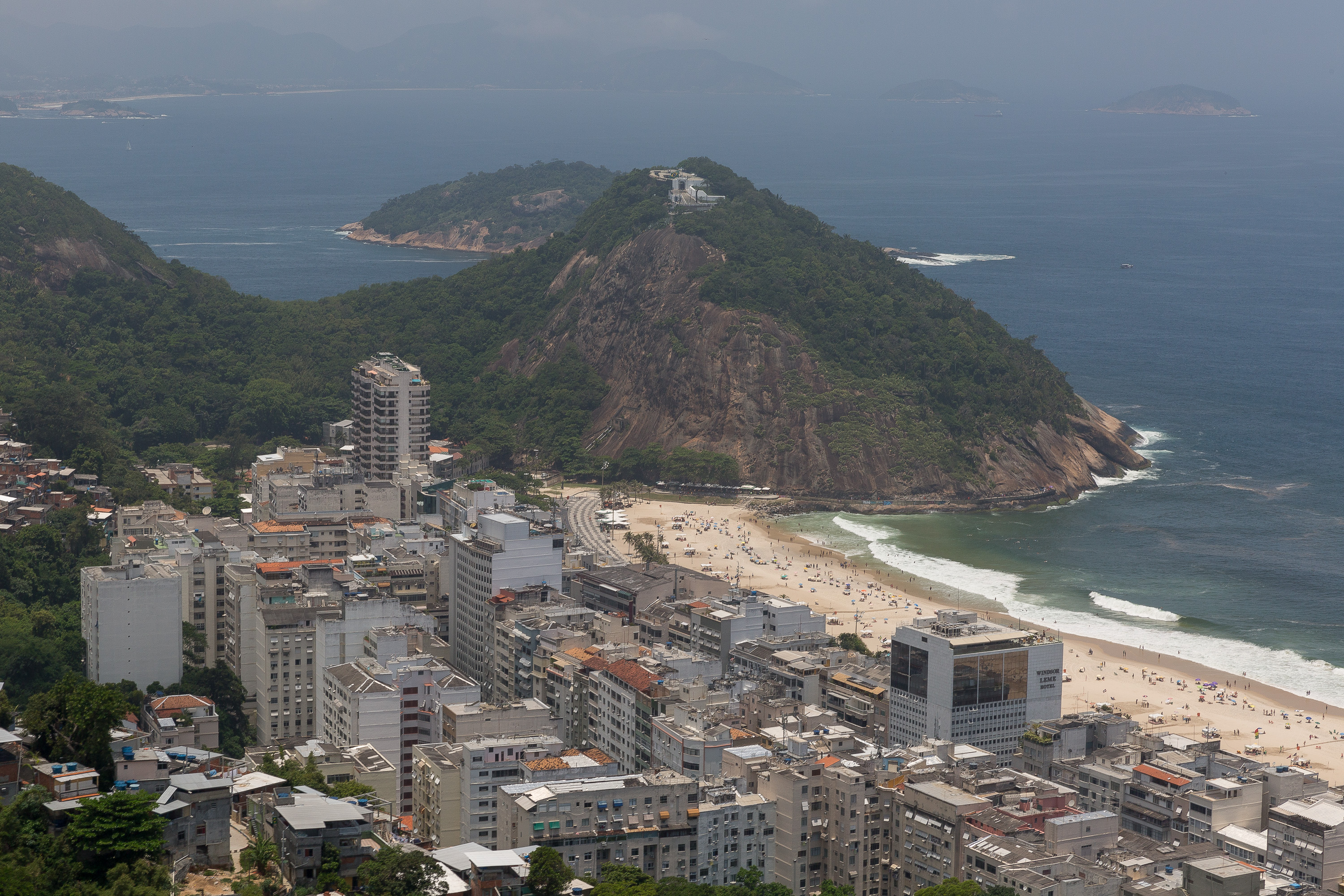

- Location in Rio de Janeiro Leme (Brazil)
- Coordinates: 22°57′44″S 43°10′00″W
- Country: Brazil
- State: Rio de Janeiro (RJ)
- Municipality/City: Rio de Janeiro
- Zone: South Zone

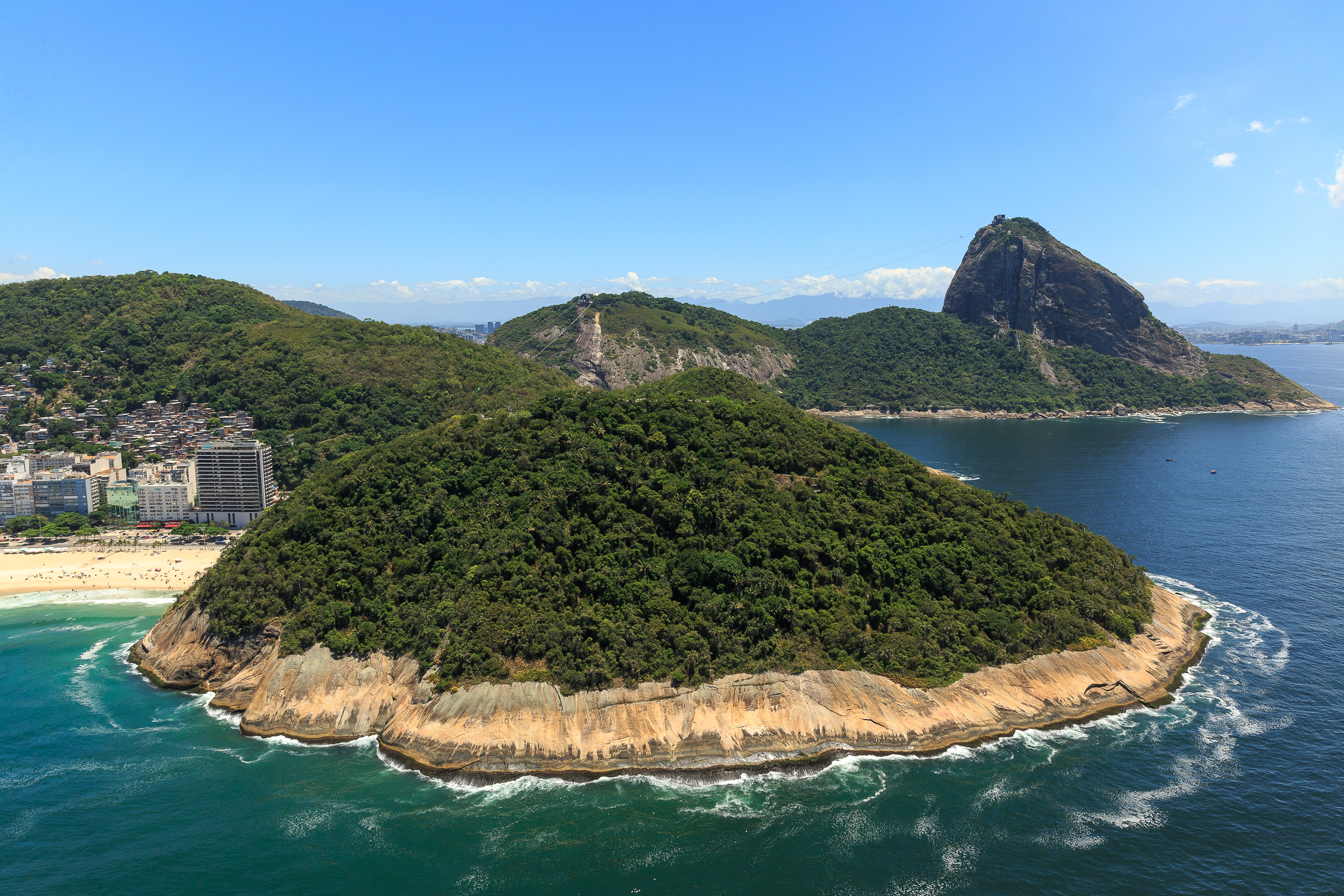
Leme

Leme (Portuguese pronunciation: [ˈlẽmi], rudder) is an upper-middle-class neighborhood in the South Zone of the City of Rio de Janeiro, Brazil, next to Copacabana, Urca and Botafogo. The neighborhood takes its name from a nearby rock formation whose shape resembles the rudder of a ship.

In 1975 the hotel Le Méridien, one of the tallest buildings in the Leme beach, was built. Le Méridien closed in 2007 and was sold in 2009 to Windsor Hotels for around R$170 million. After a refurbishment, it was reopened in January 2011 as the Windsor Atlantica Hotel.

Every year in the days leading up to New Year's on December 31 the traditional processions honoring Yemaja begin here. The famous party of Réveillon or New Year's Eve in Copacabana extends completely into Leme as well.
