= Le Méridien Cyberport Hotel =

Hotel in Hong Kong

Le Méridien Hong Kong, Cyberport
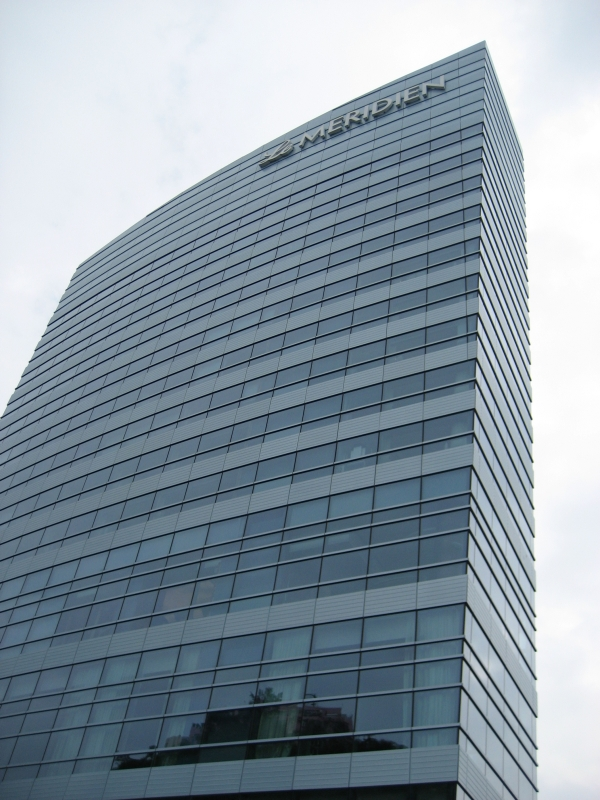

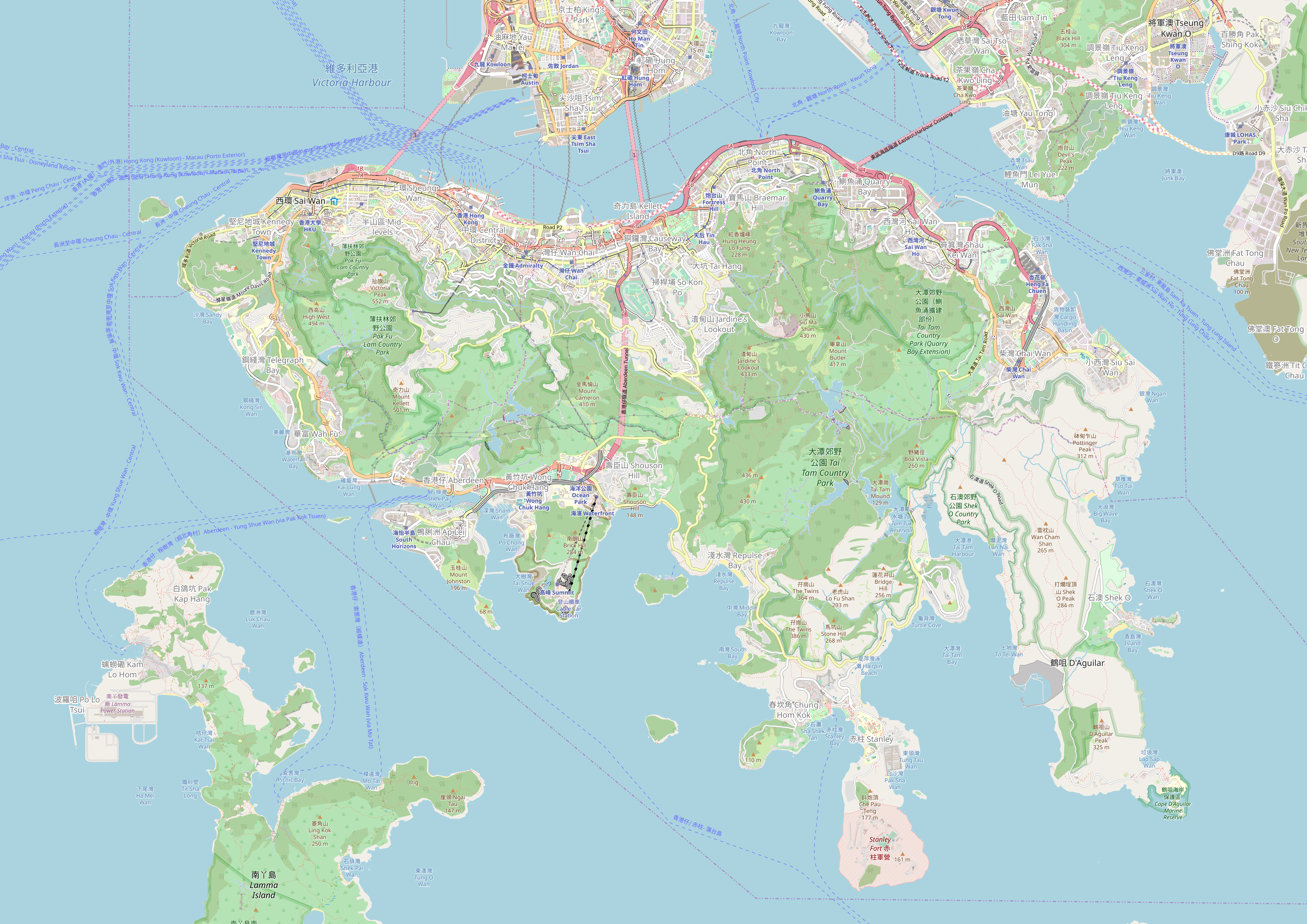
- Location on Hong Kong Island

General information
- Status: Completed
- Type: Hospitality
- Location: 100 Cyberport Road; Hong Kong Island, Hong Kong
- Coordinates: 22°15′41.35″N 114°7′47.02″E
- Completed: 2004
- Opening: 20 April 2004; 22 years ago
- Owner: Marriott International

Design and construction
- Architect: Arquitectonica
- Developer: Pacific Century Premium Developments Limited

Le Méridien Cyberport Hotel
- Traditional Chinese: 香港數碼港艾美酒店
- Simplified Chinese: 香港数码港艾美酒店
Transcriptions
Standard Mandarin
- Hanyu Pinyin: Xiānggǎng Shùmǎgǎng Ài Měi Jiǔdiàn
Yue: Cantonese
- Jyutping: hoeng1 gong2 sou3 maa5 gong2 ngaai6 mei5 zau2 dim3

Le Méridien Hong Kong, Cyberport (Chinese: 香港數碼港艾美酒店) is a 170-room hotel forming part of the Cyberport digital community development in Hong Kong's Telegraph Bay, in Southern District. It opened on 20 April 2004 and is operated by Le Méridien, a design-focused brand of Marriott International. From 2021 to 2022, the hotel underwent a major facelift.

Le Méridien was awarded a 10-year management contract for this hotel to be built at the Cyberport complex. The hotel has been listed by British newspaper The Independent as one of the five best "hi-tech hotels".

== See also ==
- List of buildings and structures in Hong Kong
