= Le Méridien =

Hotel brand

- Type: Subsidiary
- Industry: Hospitality
- Founded: 1972; 54 years ago
- Founder: Air France
- Headquarters: Bethesda, Maryland, United States
- Number of locations: 119 (December 2023)
- Area served: Worldwide
- Parent: Marriott International
- Website: le-meridien.marriott.com

Le Méridien (French: [l(ə) meʁidjɛ̃]) is an American upscale, design-focused international hotel brand with a European perspective. It was originally founded by Air France in 1972 and was later based in the United Kingdom. Marriott International now owns the chain. As of June 2021, it had a portfolio of 109 open hotels with 29,439 rooms and a pipeline of 37 hotels with 9,585 upcoming rooms.

== History ==
=== Foundation and early years ===
Air France established Meridien Hotels in 1972. The chain's hotels offered accommodation for Air France flight crews in major hub cities, and the airline promoted the chain and handled reservations for it. The first Meridien Hotels property was a 1,000-room hotel in the heart of Paris, the Hotel Meridien Paris, today known as Le Méridien Paris Arc de Triomphe (formerly Le Méridien Etoile). The chain grew to 10 hotels in Europe and Africa within two years and had 21 hotels spanning the globe within six years.

In 1994, as part of a cost-cutting measure, Air France sold its controlling interest in Meridien Hotels Inc., a 57.3% stake, to the UK-based Forte Group for $207 million. Meridien Hotels numbered 58 properties at the time. The sale followed an 18-month battle for control of the company between Forte, German-based Kempinski and French hospitality company Accor. The French government was reported to have favored Accor's bid, wishing to keep the company French-owned, while the European Commission was reported to have favored Forte over Accor and to have pressured Air France to sell to Forte, in exchange for a vital 20 billion Franc bailout for the airline. Forte simultaneously announced their intention to buy the remaining minority stakes in the hotel chain from Crédit Foncier de France, Crédit Lyonnais and other shareholders.

UK conglomerate Granada won a hostile takeover battle for Forte in January 1996. Granada convinced majority shareholders to sell to them, rather than Rocco Forte, son of the company's founder, who feared Granada would strip the company of its assets. Granada assumed control of Forte for $5.9 billion. Soon after, in May 1996, Granada announced its intention to sell the 18 luxury hotels of the Forte Hotels chain, but to retain the 85 hotels in the Meridien Hotels chain. The 2000 merger of Forte and caterer Compass Group, and demerger within a year, passed the Forte Hotels division's three remaining brands (Le Méridien, Heritage Hotels and Posthouse Forte) to Compass.

=== Development since 2000 ===
In May 2001, Nomura Group acquired Le Méridien Hotels & Resorts from Compass for £1.9 billion, and Le Méridien was merged with Principal Hotels, which had been acquired in February 2001. In December 2003, Lehman Brothers Holdings acquired the senior debt of Le Méridien.

US-based Starwood acquired Le Méridien on November 24, 2005. A Lehman Brothers and Starwood Capital Group joint venture obtained the leased and owned real estate assets in a separate deal. Over the following five years, 45 of these 130 properties were sold, and 20 new ones were added to the chain.

In September 2016, Marriott gained the Le Méridien brand as part of its acquisition of Starwood.

== Locations ==
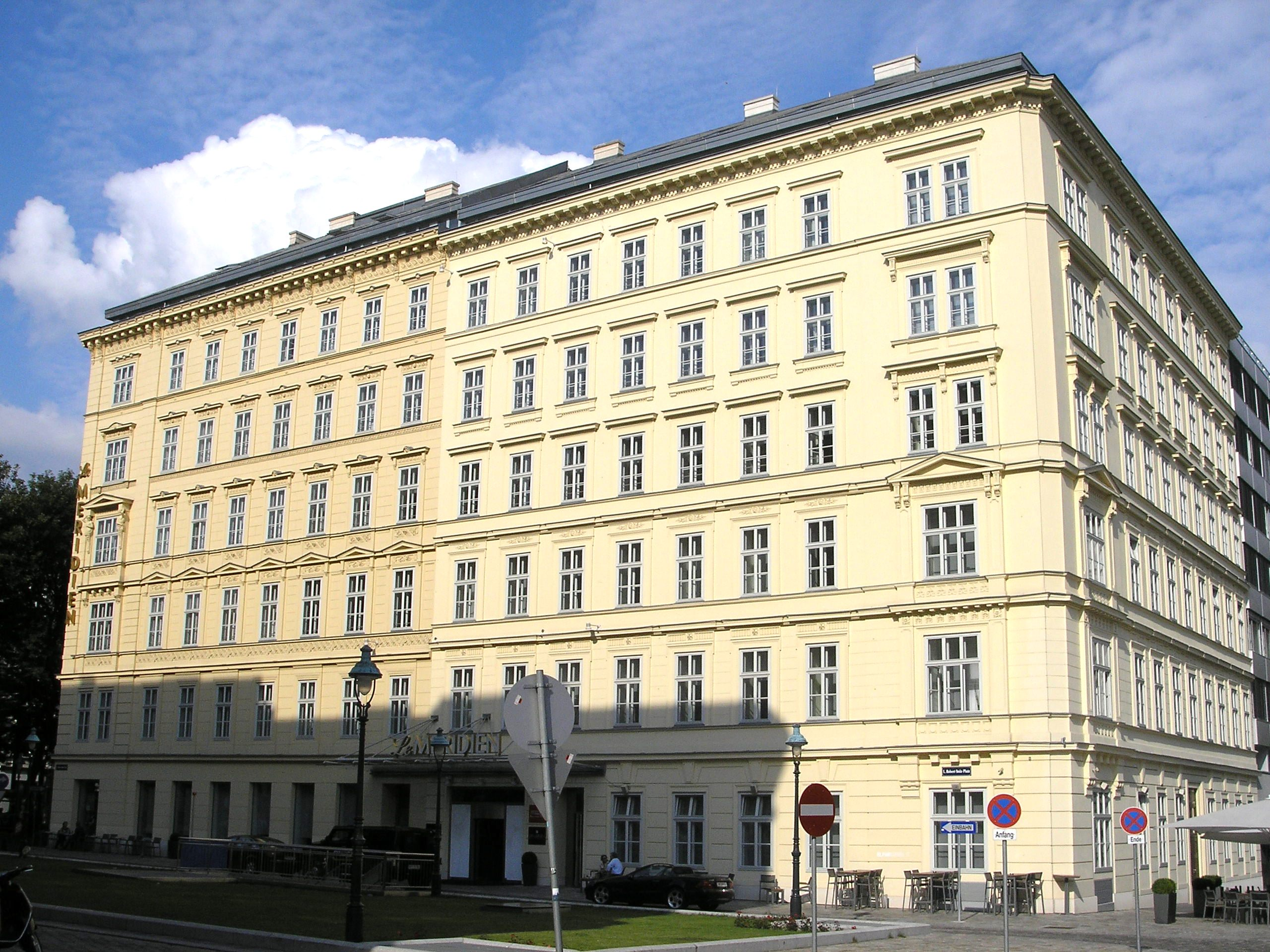
Le Méridien in Vienna

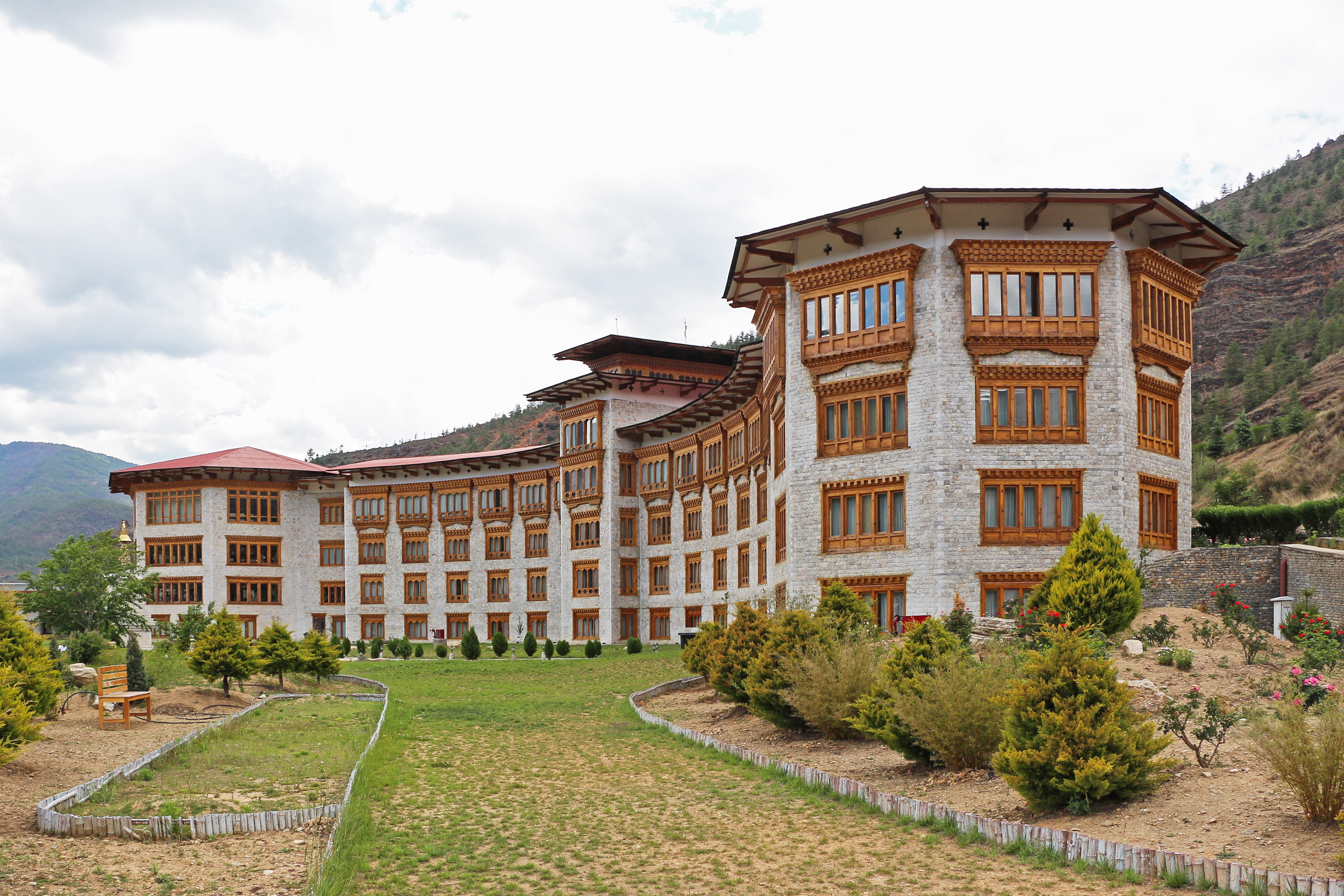
Le Méridien in Paro

		North America	Europe	Middle East & Africa	Asia & Pacific	Caribbean & Latin America	Total
2016	Properties	20	15	27	42	2	106
2016	Rooms	4,473	5,051	7,530	10,973	271	28,298
2017	Properties	22	16	27	45	2	112
2017	Rooms	5,006	5,292	7,530	11,630	271	29,729
2018	Properties	19	15	24	47	2	107
2018	Rooms	3,987	5,010	6,612	12,154	271	28,034
2019	Properties	21	15	23	49	2	110
2019	Rooms	4,480	5,021	6,526	12,903	271	29,201
2020	Properties	22	16	22	47	2	109
2020	Rooms	4,748	4,997	6,588	12,683	271	29,287
2021	Properties	24	16	21	47	2	110
2021	Rooms	5,287	5,156	6,124	12,446	271	29,284
2022	Properties	25	16	23	49	2	115
2022	Rooms	5,705	5,154	6,848	12,486	271	30,464
2023	Properties	25	16	23	52	3	119
2023	Rooms	5,489	5,156	6,841	12,981	562	31,029

== Notable properties ==
- Baghdad, Iraq: The Palestine Hotel, which overlooks the Firdos Square and the Tigris, was built as the Palestine Méridien Hotel in 1982. As a result of UN sanctions slapped on Iraq in the aftermath of the Gulf War, Le Méridien severed its affiliation with the hotel in 1991.
- Boston, United States: The Langham Hotel Boston, previously housing the Federal Reserve Bank of Boston, was repurposed as a Le Méridien hotel in 1981. It became a Langham in 2003.
- Cairo, Egypt: The Grand Nile Tower Hotel opened as Le Méridien Cairo in 1974, before leaving the chain in 2002.
- Casablanca, Morocco: The Royal Mansour Casablanca was affiliated with Le Méridien prior to 2014. The hotel has been closed and demolished as of 2017.
- Chennai, India: The Le Royal Méridien Chennai is located on the Anna Salai. It was originally built as a Hilton, but opened as a Le Méridien after the contract with Hilton fell through.
- Chicago, United States: The McGraw–Hill Building, built by artist Gwen Lux, was demolished in 1998, but its façade and location were repurposed for Le Méridien Chicago, which opened in 2000. The hotel became a Conrad in 2005, then The Luxury Collection in 2015, its name being rechristened The Gwen, in honor of Gwen Lux.
- Cologne, Germany: The Dom-Hotel was formerly operated by Le Méridien prior to 2013. It is one of the oldest luxury hotels in Europe, with history dating back to the mid-1850s.
- Copenhagen, Denmark: The Palace Hotel was known as Le Méridien Copenhagen from 2005 to 2009.
- Hong Kong, China: The Le Méridien Cyberport Hotel forms part of the Cyberport business park in Hong Kong's Telegraph Bay.
- Houston, United States: The Le Méridien Houston Downtown occupies the Melrose Building, the first International Style building in Houston.
- Indianapolis, United States: The historic Le Méridien Indianapolis Hotel dates back to 1928 as the Lockerbie Hotel. It became a Le Méridien in 2014.
- Kuwait City, Kuwait: The JW Marriott Kuwait City opened in 1980 as Le Méridien Kuwait, one of the first international-branded hotels in the city. Marriott assumed management of the hotel in 2002, rebranding it as a JW Marriott.
- London, United Kingdom: The historic Piccadilly Hotel was operated by Le Méridien between 1986 and 2020.
- Lhaviyani Atoll, Maldives: In September 2021 the first Le Méridien Resort in the Maldives opened its door at the island of Thilamaafushi. It is famous for having exclusive access to one of Maldives best housereefs.
- Malta:
  - The Malta Marriott Hotel & Spa in St. Julian's was formerly a Le Méridien prior to a 2018 renovation.
  - The Art Deco-style Hotel Phoenicia in Floriana, built in 1947, was reflagged as a Le Méridien in 1997, but left the chain in 2007.
- Manchester, United Kingdom: The Grade II* listed Kimpton Clocktower Hotel was operated by Le Méridien between 2001 and 2004. It was once an office building owned by the Refuge Assurance Company, before it was repurposed as a hotel in 1996.
- Melbourne, Australia: The Palace Theatre on Bourke Street in the Melbourne central business district was converted into a Le Méridien hotel in March 2023. On 16 March 2023, Le Meridien re-opened in Melbourne after previously operating a hotel in The Rialto. The new hotel is placed over the spot previously occupied by the Palace Theatre. The hotel cost $100 million to build. Shortly after, Le Méridien announced the opening of Le Méridien Melbourne, marking the return of the Le Méridien brand to Australia.
- Moscow, Russia: The historic Hotel National was opened to the public in 1903. Following the fall of the Soviet Union, the Russian government transferred its ownership to the local government, which brought Forte Hotels to operate the property. It became a Le Méridien in 1996, and remained so until 2009, when it was transferred to The Luxury Collection.
- New Orleans, United States: The Le Méridien New Orleans opened as a Holiday Inn Crowne Plaza in 1984 in time for the 1984 Louisiana World Exposition. It then went through periods of becoming a Four Points by Sheraton and W Hotel. The property was badly damaged by the Hurricane Katrina, during which half of its windows were blown out. Following extensive renovations, it was rebranded a Le Méridien in 2014.
- New Taipei, Taiwan: The Le Méridien Taipei Banqiao is located in the Xinban Special District of New Taipei.
- New York City, United States: The Thompson Central Park New York Hotel was first opened as the Hotel Parker Méridien New York in 1981. It left the chain in 2018.
- Paris, France: The Pullman Paris Montparnasse Hotel, the third largest hotel in Paris, was managed by Le Méridien between 1986 and 2010, when it left the chain for Accor's Pullman.
- Rio de Janeiro, Brazil: The Hilton Rio de Janeiro Copacabana was opened as a Le Méridien in 1976. The affiliation ended in 2007.
- San Francisco, United States: The Le Méridien San Francisco was previously a Park Hyatt prior to its 2006 purchase by HEI Hotels & Resorts. In 2023, it was transferred to the Autograph Collection.
- St. Louis, United States: The Hotel Majestic St. Louis is listed on the National Register of Historic Places. It has been a Le Méridien since 2020.
- Taichung, Taiwan: The Le Méridien Taichung is located in front of the Taichung railway station.
- Taipei, Taiwan: The Le Méridien Taipei is located in the Xinyi Planning District of Taipei.
- Toronto, Canada: The Omni King Edward Hotel was operated by Le Méridien between 1994 and 2012, when it became an independent hotel.
- Warsaw, Poland: The Hotel Bristol was managed by Le Méridien from 1998 to 2013, when it was transferred to The Luxury Collection.
