= Hilton Rio de Janeiro Copacabana =

Hotel in Rio de Janeiro, Brazil

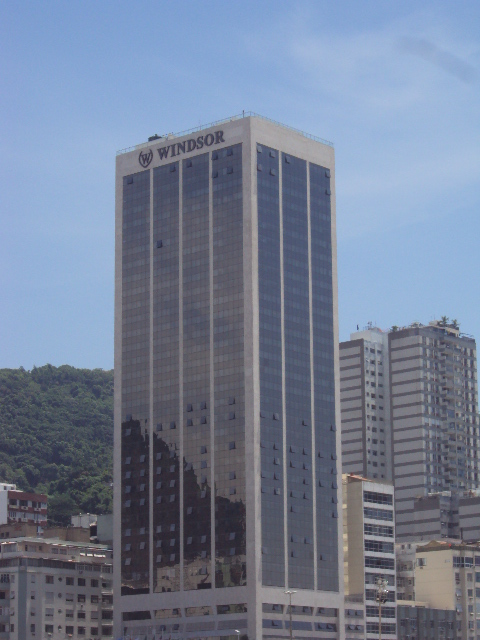

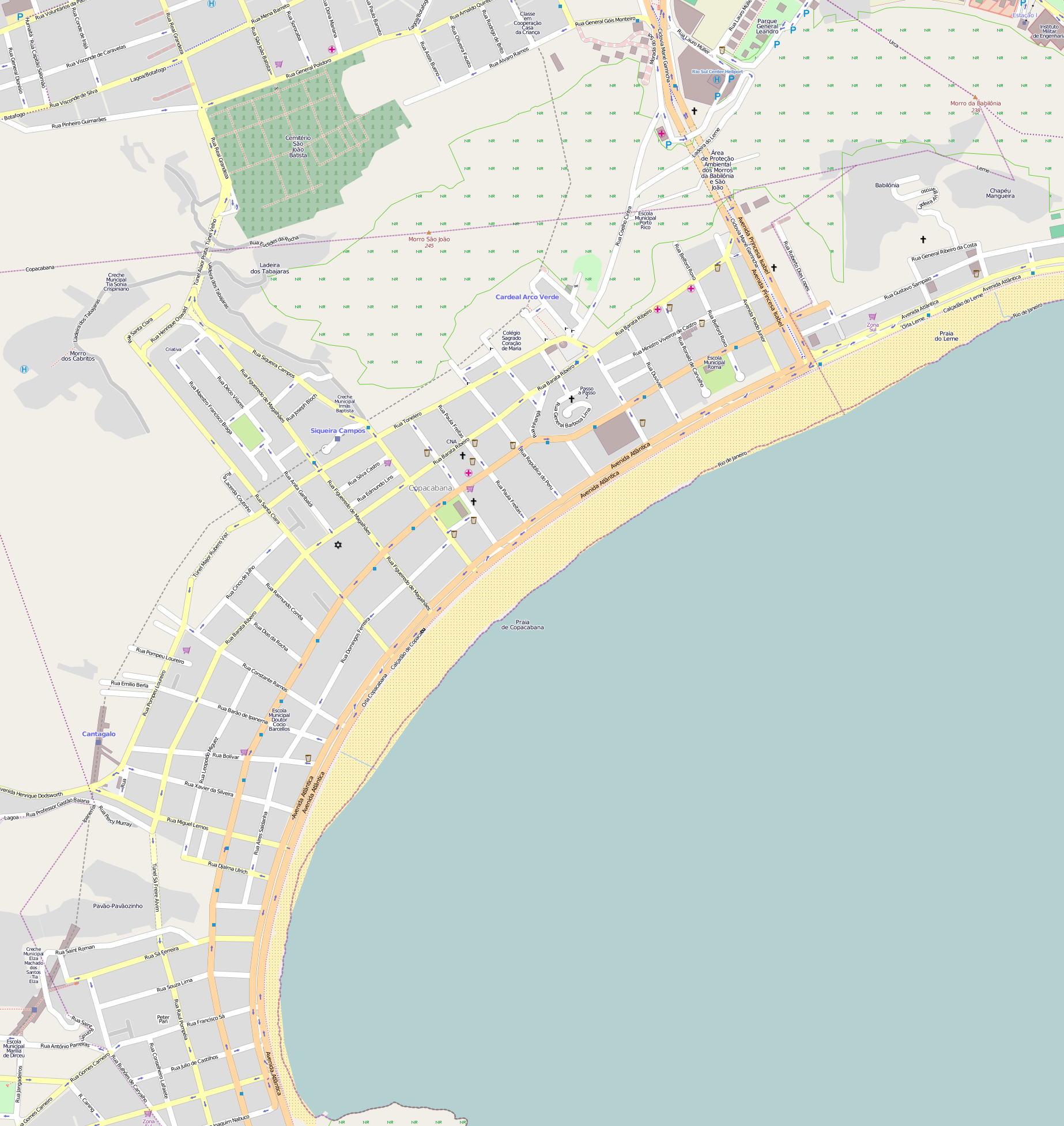
- Location within Copacabana, Rio de Janeiro

General information
- Location: Leme, Rio de Janeiro, Brazil
- Coordinates: 22°57′51″S 43°10′23″W
- Opening: 1976
- Operator: Hilton Hotels

Technical details
- Floor count: 37

Design and construction
- Architects: Paulo Casé and Luiz Acioli

Other information
- Number of rooms: 545
- Number of restaurants: 2

Hilton Rio de Janeiro Copacabana is a 110-metre 37-storey skyscraper hotel in the Leme neighbourhood of Rio de Janeiro, Brazil. It is the tallest building on Leme Beach.

== History ==
The hotel originally opened in 1976 as the Hotel Meridien Copacabana, later Le Méridien Copacabana. In 2007, Starwood sold the building to Iberostar Hotels & Resorts, which closed the hotel and started a renovation of the building in the same year, which was eventually abandoned in 2008. In 2009, the hotel was sold again to Windsor Hotels for around R$170 million. After a refurbishment, it was reopened in January 2011 as the Windsor Atlântica Hotel. The hotel was sold to Blackstone in March 2017. It converted to the Hilton Rio de Janeiro Copacabana on May 2, 2017.

== See also ==
Rio Sul Center, tall shopping center within walking distance
