= JW Marriott Kuwait City =

Hotel in Kuwait City, Kuwait

Coordinates: 29°21′54″N 47°58′3″E

JW Marriott Kuwait City is a luxury hotel in Kuwait City, Kuwait. Formerly Le Méridien Kuwait, the hotel's management was transferred to Marriott International in November 2002, and it was rebranded as a JW Marriott on January 1, 2003. The hotel has 313 rooms, including seventy-four suites.

The hotel is part of a mixed-use development including the high-end Salhia Complex shopping mall, offices above the mall and the Sahab Tower office building, and is the flagship development of owners Salhia Real Estate Company.

== History ==
In 1978, the Salhia Real Estate Company began construction on a mixed-use project including a mall with attached hotel. Opened in 1980, Le Méridien Kuwait as one of the most luxurious hotels in the area, and as one of the first international-class hotels in Kuwait.

In 1990, the hotel's lobby and first floor were set on fire by Iraqi soldiers during the Iraqi invasion of Kuwait, and the interiors sustained damage. Following the Invasion, these impacted areas were restored and reconstructed to reopen to guests.

In 2002, Salhia concluded its management agreement with Le Méridien and signed an agreement with Marriott International to debut its JW Marriott brand of luxury properties in Kuwait from January 1, 2003.

In 2003, the hotel served as a major hub for visiting journalists during the war in Iraq. Severe security measures were undertaken at the hotel, including the scanning of all incoming vehicles, passing through metal detectors, luggage scanning, identity tests, and the parking of vehicles several meters from the hotel's entrance and porte cochère.

== Renovations ==
Since January 1, 2003 the hotel has embarked on several multi-million dollar renovation projects, which included the refurbishment of the hotel's lobby, restaurants, health facilities, and all guest rooms.

In December 2020, the hotel closed to undergo a comprehensive renovation project that resulted in gutting the tower with a new interior configuration and transformed exterior. The adjacent mall has expanded into the hotel's former lobby area and mezzanine, and the second, third and fourth floors of the hotel tower are being converted to office space. The hotel itself will occupy the fifth to sixteenth floors of the building, and it's reopen in November 30, 2025.

== See also ==
- JW Marriott Hotels
