= Hotel National, Moscow =

Five-star hotel in Moscow, Russia

Coordinates: 55.7567°N 37.6133°E

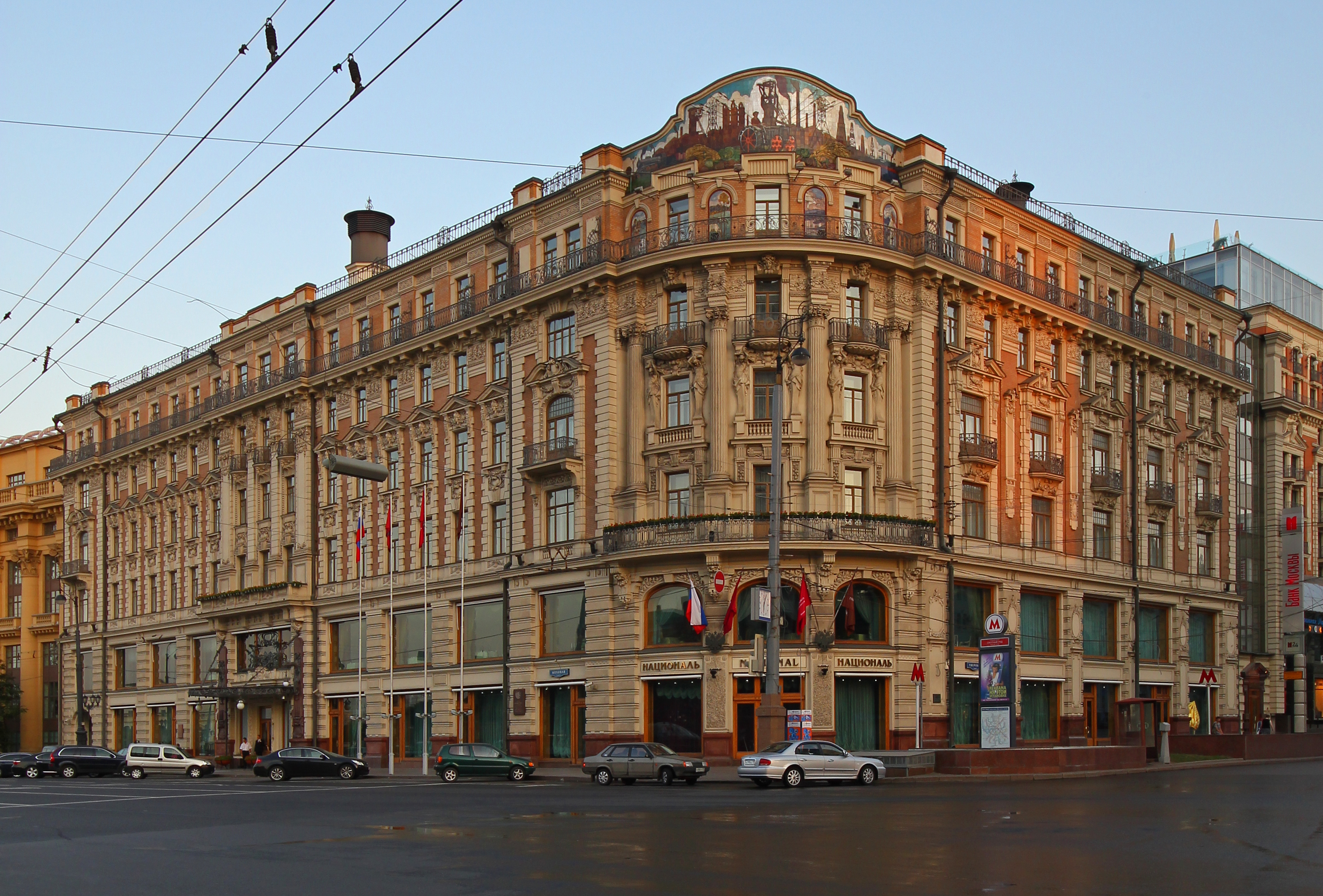
- Interactive map of the Hotel National, Moscow area

General information
- Location: Moscow, Russia
- Opening: January 14, 1903

Design and construction
- Architect: Alexander Ivanov

Other information
- Number of rooms: 202
- Number of suites: 56
- Number of restaurants: 2

Website
- Hotel National, Moscow

The Hotel National, Moscow (Russian: гости́ница «Националь») is a five-star hotel in Moscow, Russia, opened in 1903. It has 202 bedrooms and 56 suites and is located on Manege Square, directly across from The Kremlin.

== History ==
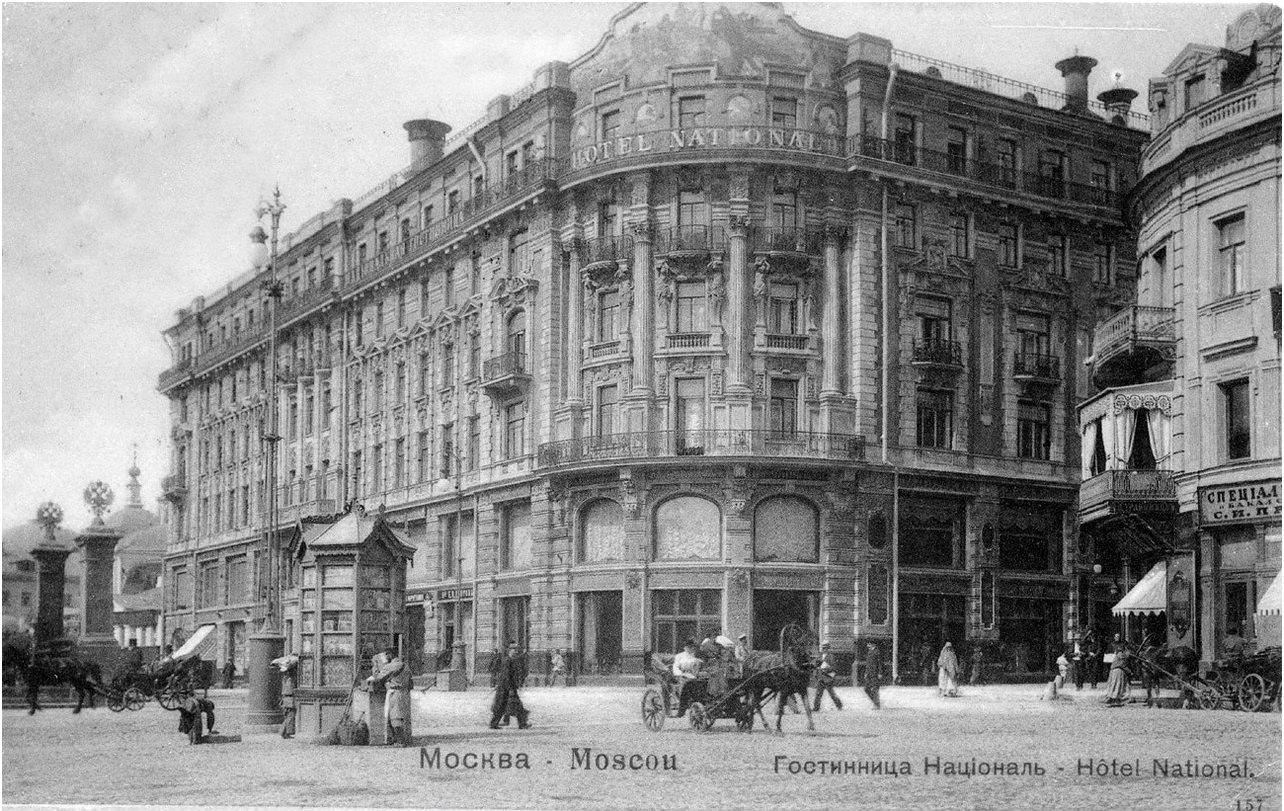
Hotel National, 1904

The Hotel National was financed by The Varvarinskoe Joint-Stock Company of Householders and designed by architect Alexander Ivanov. Construction began in 1901 and the 160-room hotel opened on January 14, 1903. The hotel's opening is sometimes listed as January 1, because Russia was still using the Julian calendar at the time, which was 13 days behind the Gregorian calendar used in the rest of the world. In 1915 the hotel made plans to add two floors on top of the six-story structure, but shortages caused by World War I meant that the work was never begun.

In the aftermath of the Russian Revolution, the capital of Russia was moved to Moscow. In March 1918, the hotel became the home of the first Soviet government. As the Kremlin had been damaged during fighting in October 1917 and was under repair, Lenin made his home in room 107 at the Hotel National with his wife for seven days. The hotel is today marked with a plaque noting this event. The hotel also accommodated other Soviet leaders, including Trotsky and secret police chief Felix Dzerzhinsky. The building continued to be used by the Soviet government afterwards as a hostel for official party delegates, and was renamed First House of Soviets in 1919.

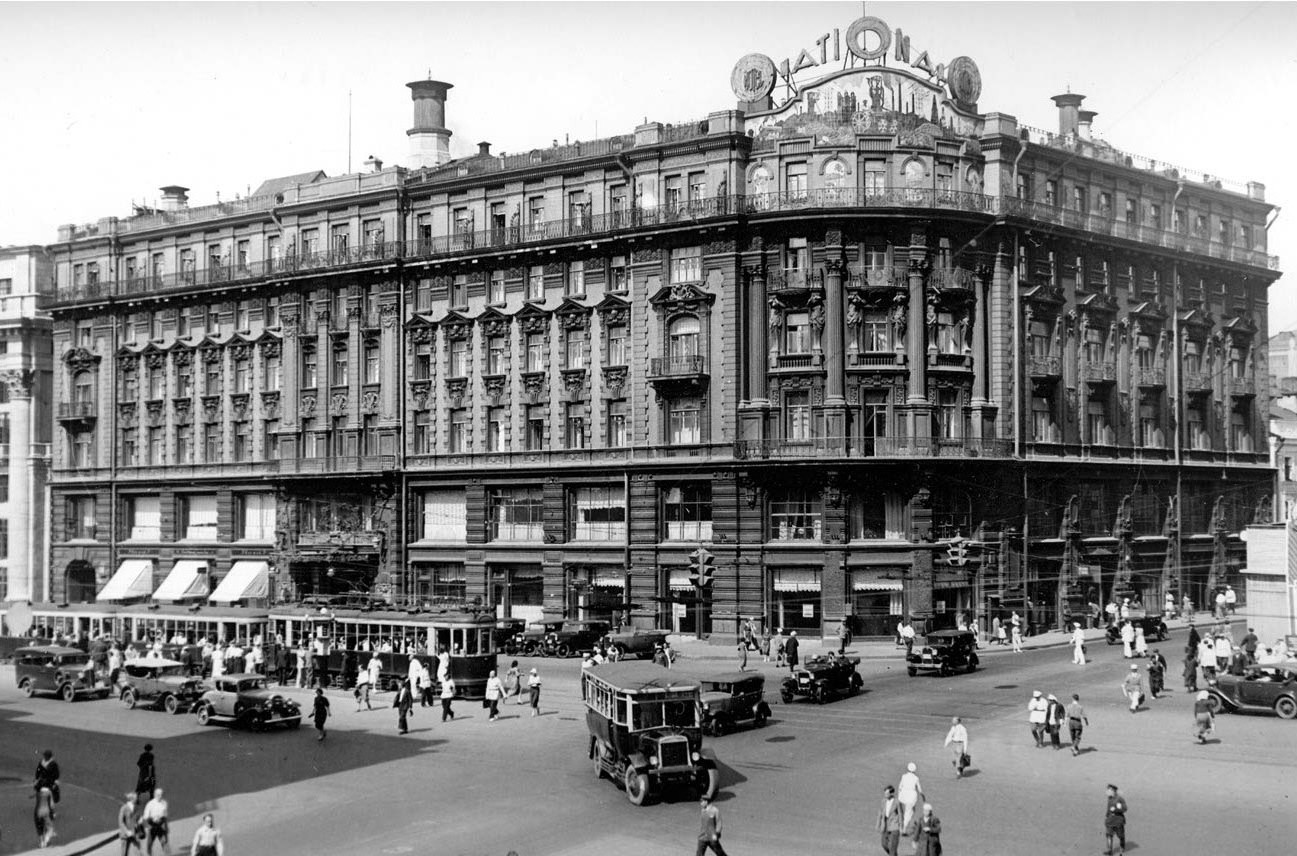
Hotel National, 1935

By 1931 the building was in need of repair and was given a complete renovation to house foreign visitors. It was redecorated with museum-quality furniture and antiques from the palaces of the Tsars and Russian nobility, including Tsarskoye Selo and the Anichkov Palace. The pieces remain in the hotel's collection to this day. The huge mosaic on the hotel's upper corner was replaced with a 120-square meter socialist realist artwork focusing on the industrial might of the Soviet economy. The Hotel National reopened under its original name in 1932. The hotel joined Intourist, the state-run tourism monopoly, in 1933.

During World War II the hotel was home to numerous Allied delegations, including the group headed by W. Averell Harriman that visited in September 1941 and British Foreign Minister Anthony Eden in December 1941.

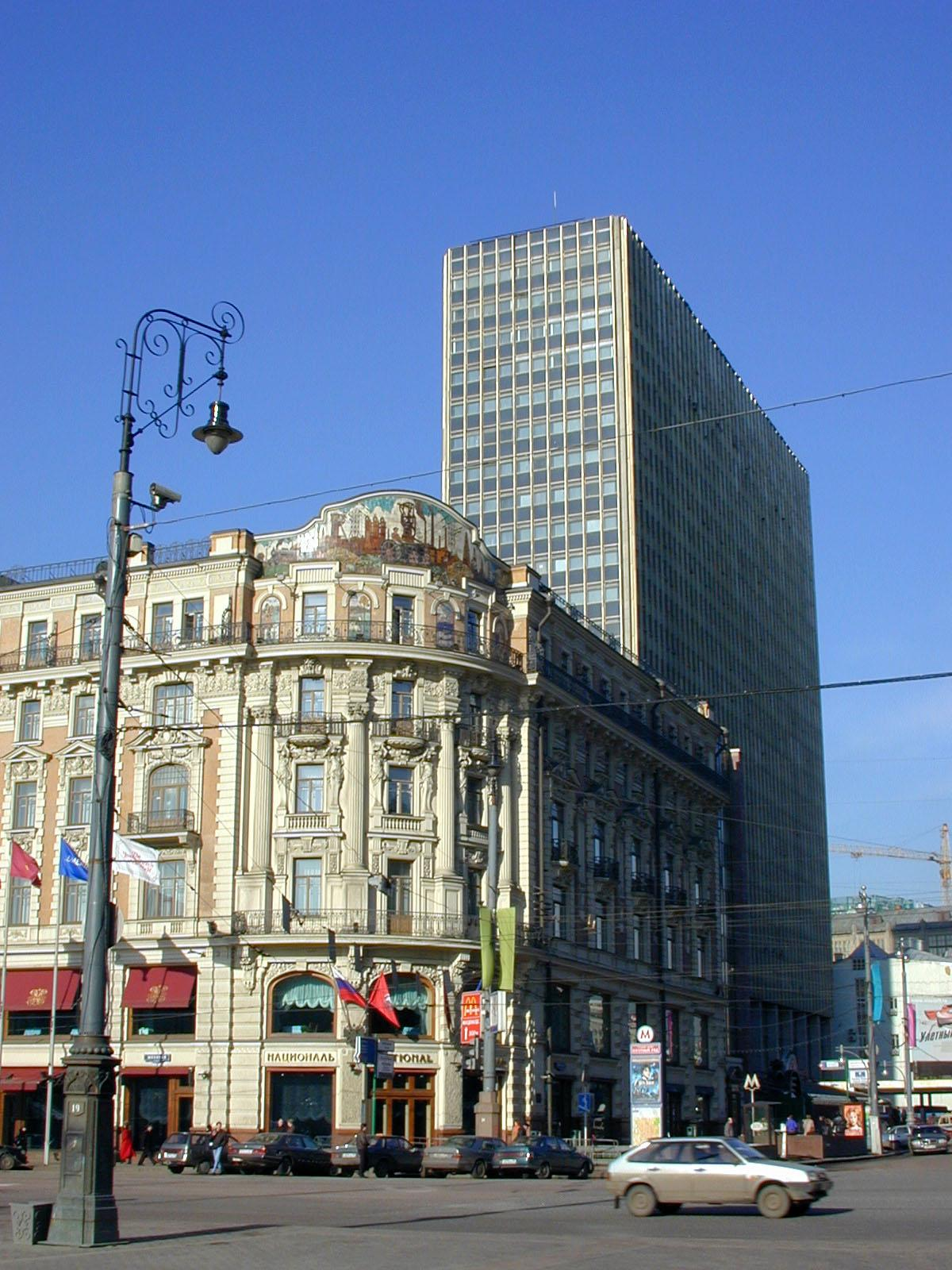
Hotel Intourist, since demolished, towering over Hotel National

In the late 1960s the Hotel Intourist, a towering, modern glass structure, was constructed adjacent to the National. The Hotel Intourist was merged with the National in 1983 and the hotels operated for a time under joint management. The Hotel National had suffered from years of neglect and when a large piece of the facade fell off in 1989, the hotel was closed for reconstruction.

The Hotel National was renovated from 1991 to 1995. It was transferred by the Russian government to the City of Moscow in 1992 and reopened on May 9, 1995, as part of Forte Hotels. When Forte took over Le Méridien Hotels & Resorts in 1996, the hotel was renamed Le Méridien National Hotel. It was further renamed Le Royal Méridien National Hotel in 1998.

On December 9, 2003, a Chechen female suicide bomber detonated herself outside the hotel. It is thought that her target was the State Duma building across the street and that the bomb detonated prematurely. Six people died and 13 were injured in the blast.

The hotel returned to its original name in 2009 when it moved from the Le Méridien brand to The Luxury Collection.

In 2011 the hotel, which had previously been owned by the City of Moscow, was privatized and sold to businessman Mikhail Gutseriev for 4.7 billion Rubles.

The hotel ceased to be managed by The Luxury Collection division of Marriott International on July 5, 2022, when Marriott severed its relationship with all 22 of its properties in Russia, due to sanctions on Russia in response to the 2022 Russian invasion of Ukraine.

== Famous guests ==
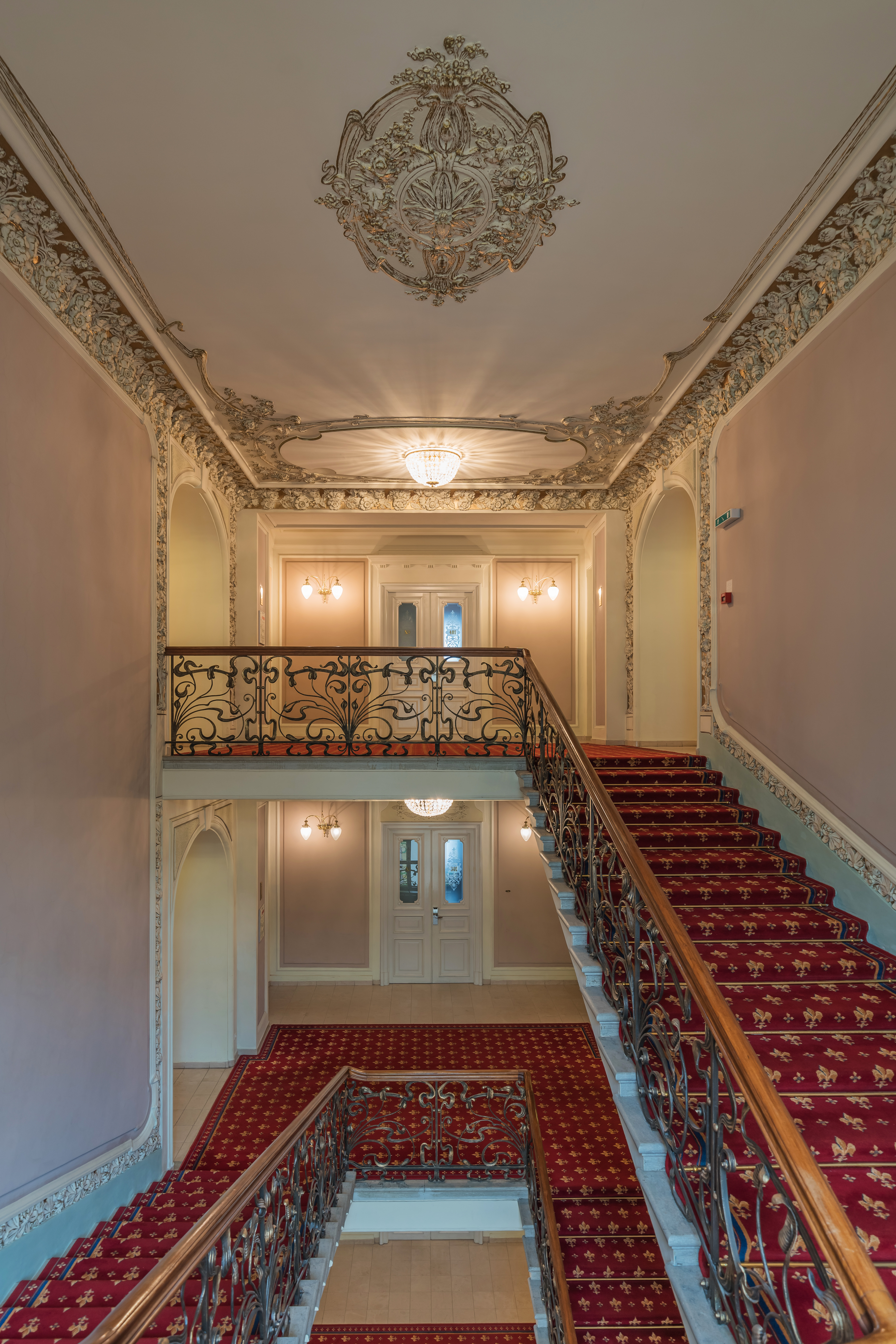
Interior of the hotel: main stairway

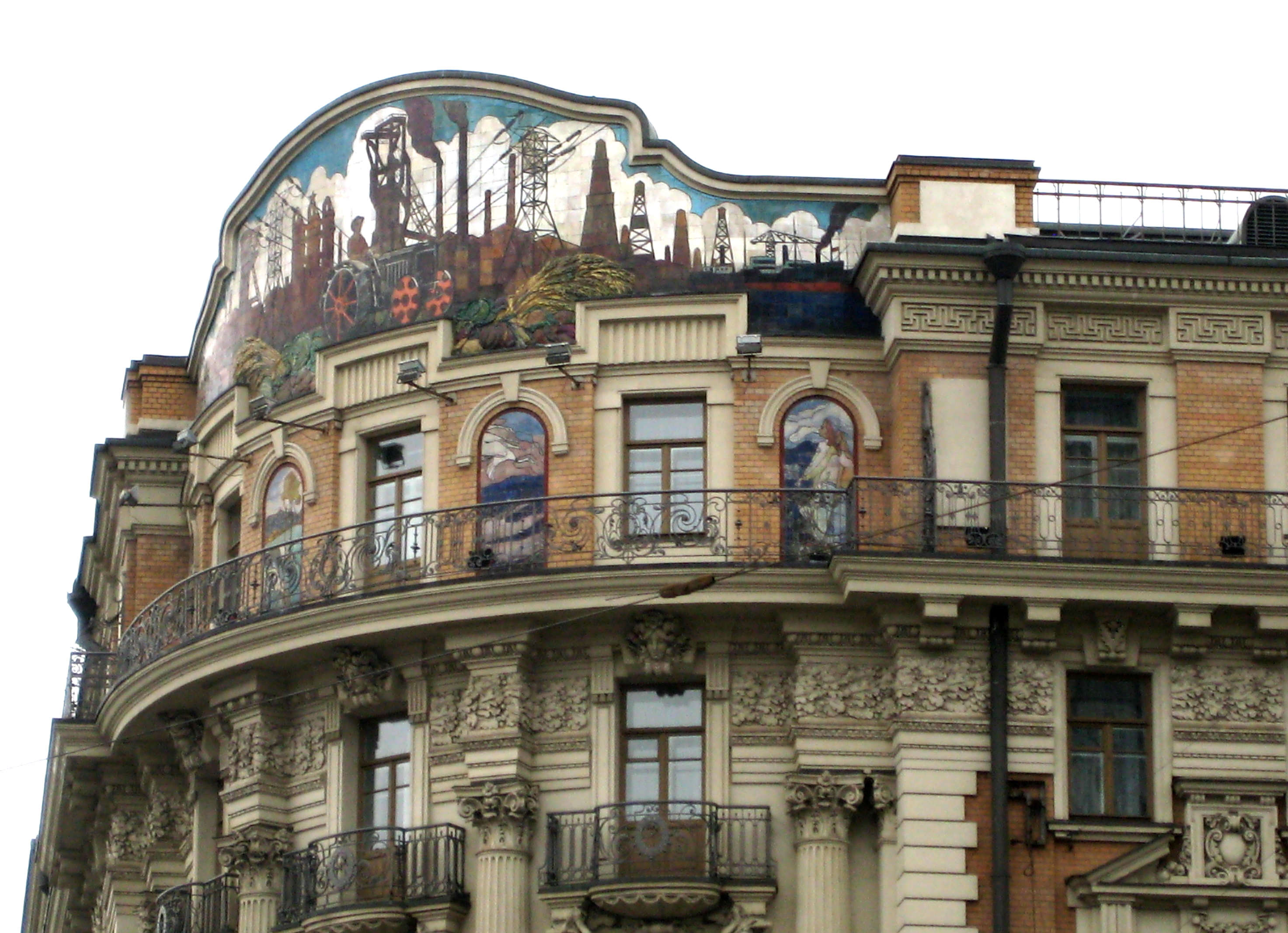
Huge socialist realist artwork atop the hotel

From the start, the hotel was popular with the Russian aristocracy and visiting celebrities. In 1933, it served as the temporary home of the first U.S. Ambassador to the Soviet Union, William Bullit, until renovation work on the Ambassador's residence at Spaso House was completed.

His Divine Grace, Srila AC Bhaktivedanta Swami, founder of the Hare Krishna movement, stayed at the hotel during his visit to Moscow in 1971.

In late 1989, multiple scenes for the 1990 film The Russia House were shot in the hotel with stars Sean Connery and Michelle Pfeiffer. In 1990, scenes for the 1992 film Back in the USSR were filmed inside and outside the hotel.

Since reopening in 1995, the hotel has welcomed Jacques Chirac, Kofi Annan, Lech Wałęsa, Shimon Peres, and Donald Trump, among many others.
