= Cyberport =

Business park on Hong Kong Island

Hong Kong Cyberport
- 數碼港
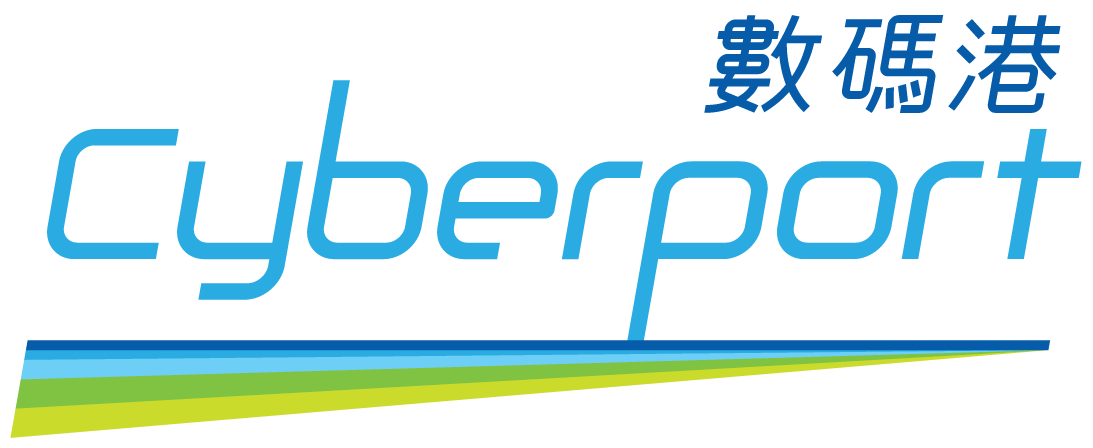

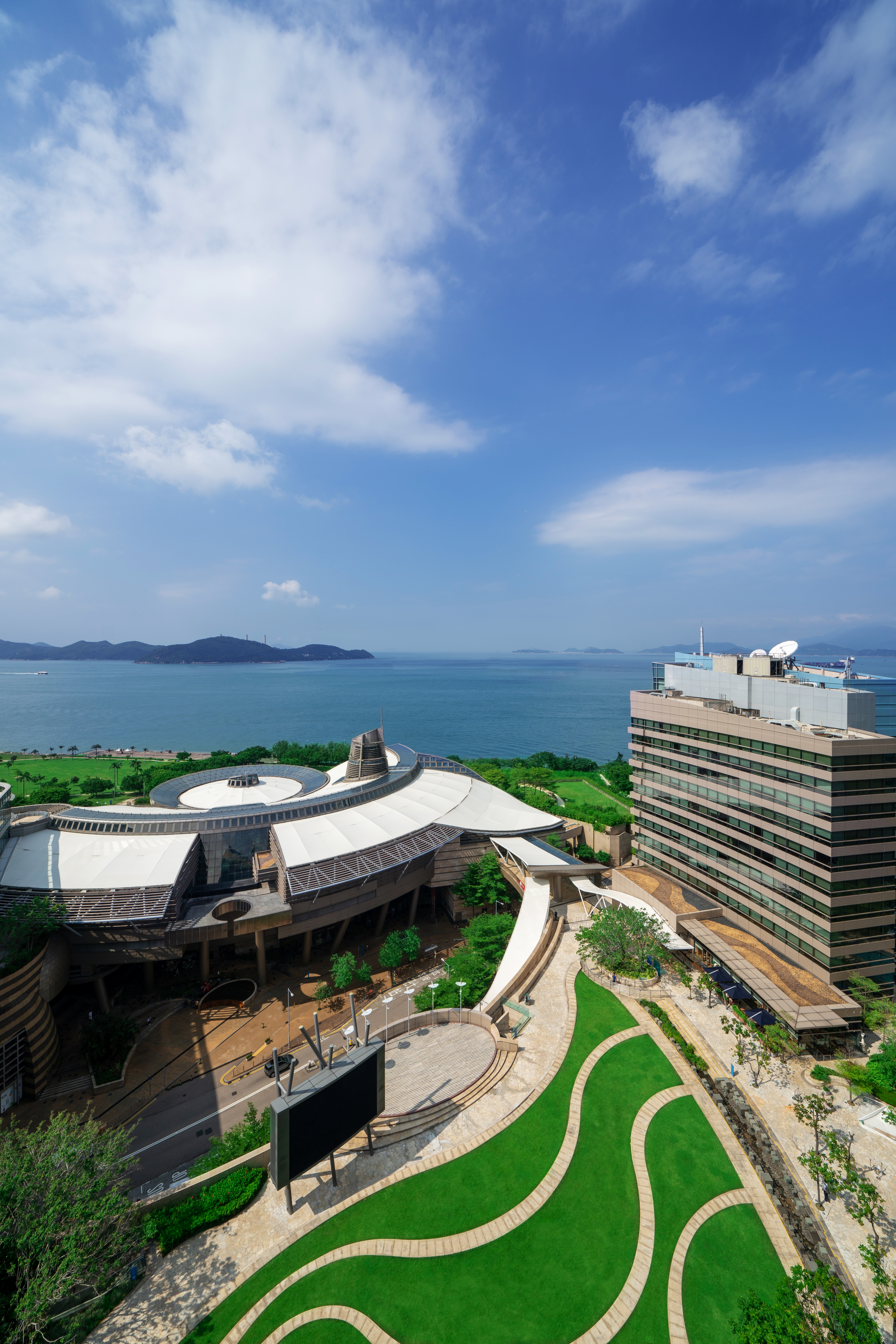
- Hong Kong Cyberport

General information
- Status: Completed
- Location: Cyberport Road, Telegraph Bay, Hong Kong
- Coordinates: 22°15′42.5″N 114°7′48.77″E
- Owner: Hong Kong SAR Government
- Operator: Hong Kong Cyberport Management Company Limited

Design and construction
- Architect: Wong Tung & Partners Limited

Website
- cyberport.hk

Cyberport
- Traditional Chinese: 數碼港
- Simplified Chinese: 数码港
Transcriptions
Standard Mandarin
- Hanyu Pinyin: Shù mǎ gǎng
- IPA: [ʂû.mà.kàŋ]
Yue: Cantonese
- Yale Romanization: Sou máah góng
- Jyutping: Sou3 maa5 gong2
- IPA: [sɔw˧.ma˩˧.kɔŋ˧˥]

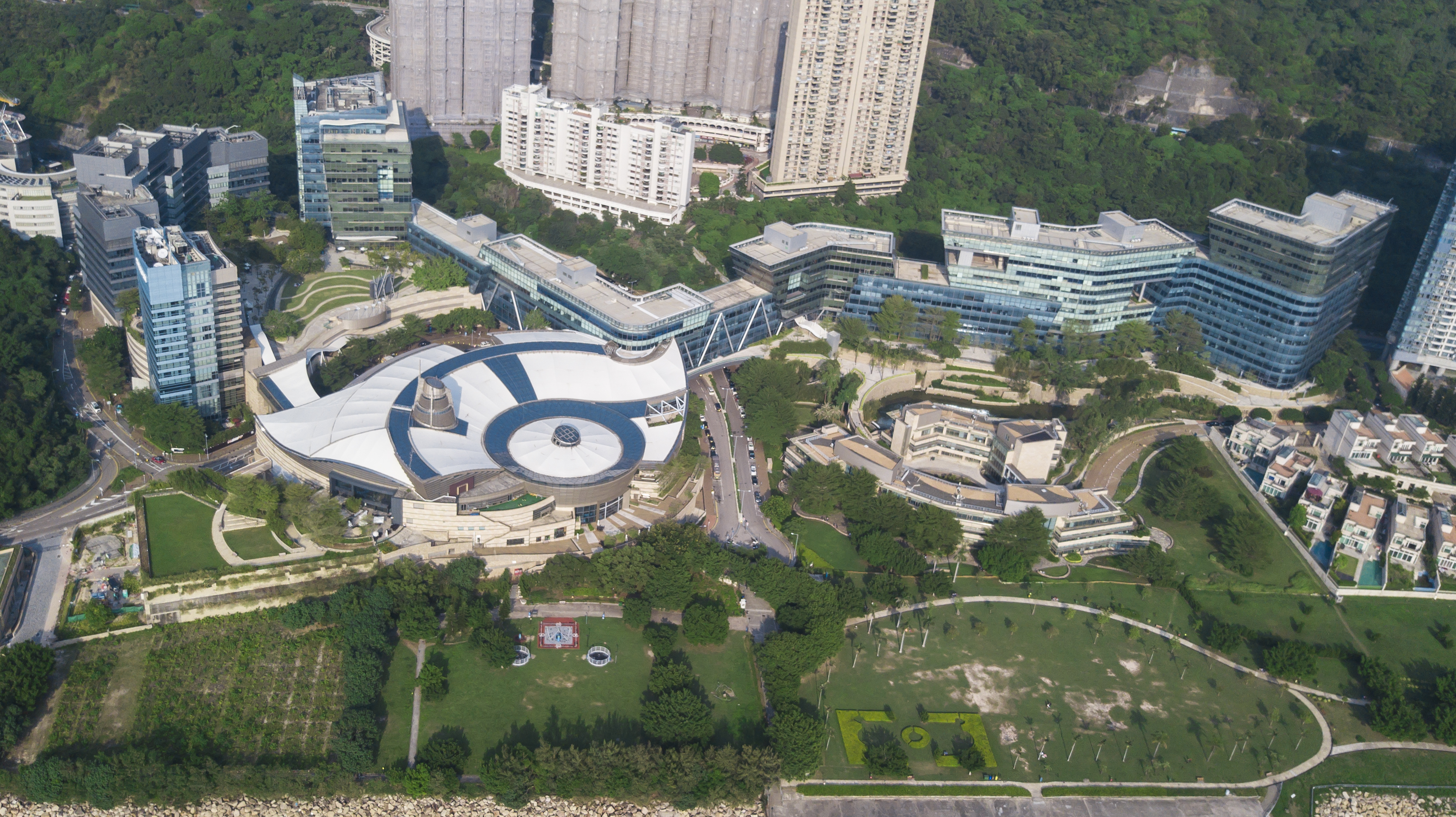
Cyberport aerial view

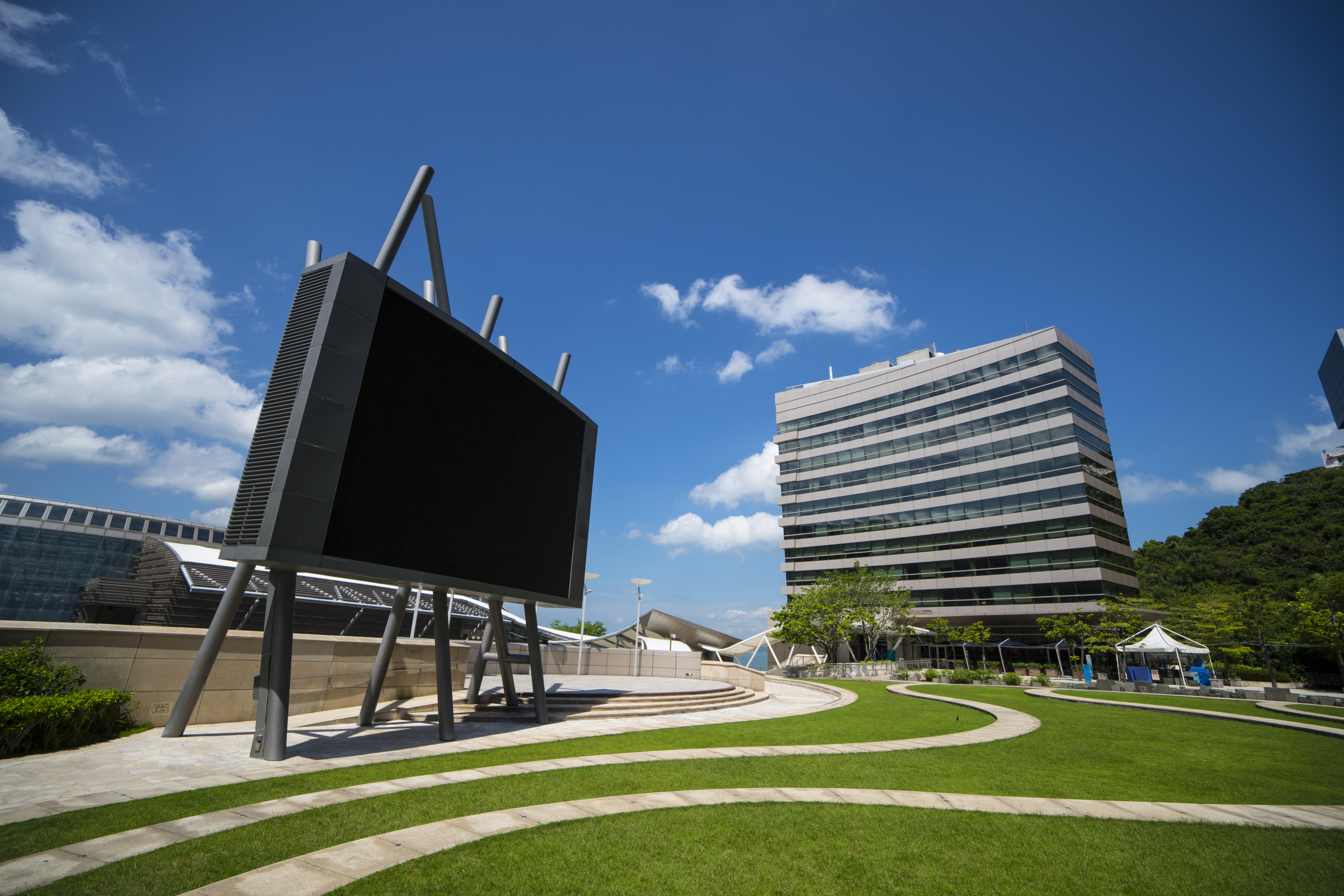
Cyberport 2 – The Podium

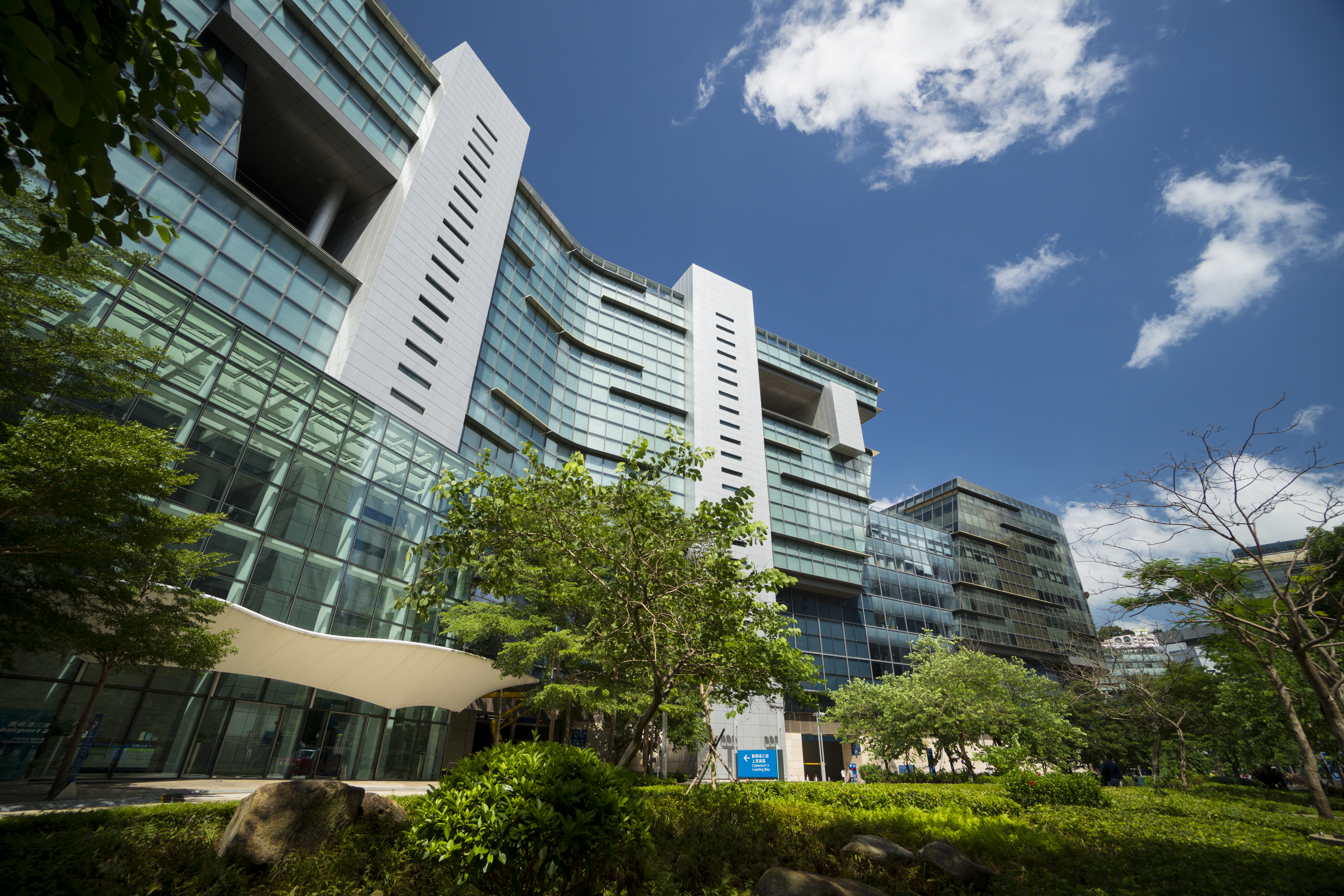
Cyberport 3

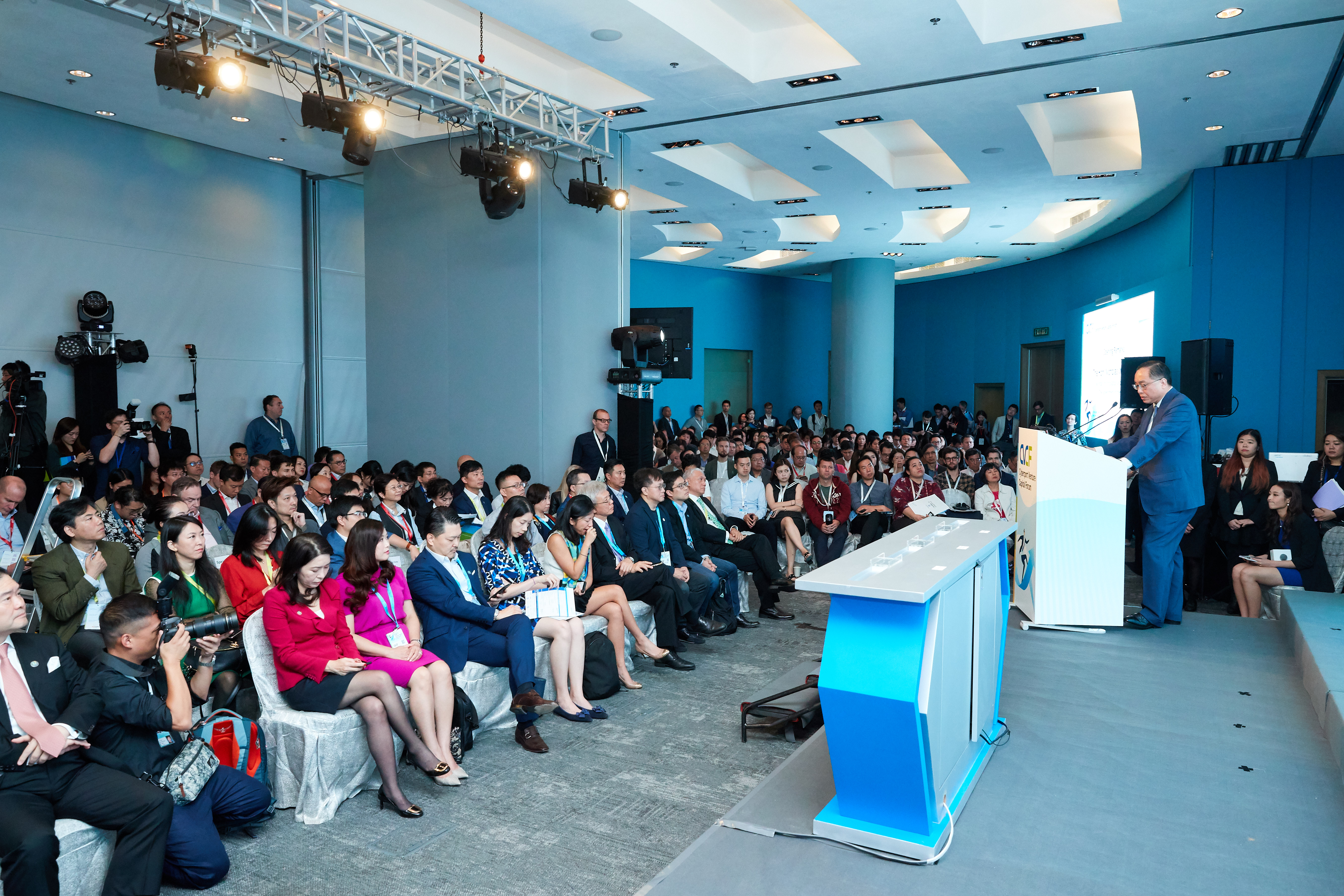
Cyberport – Function Rooms

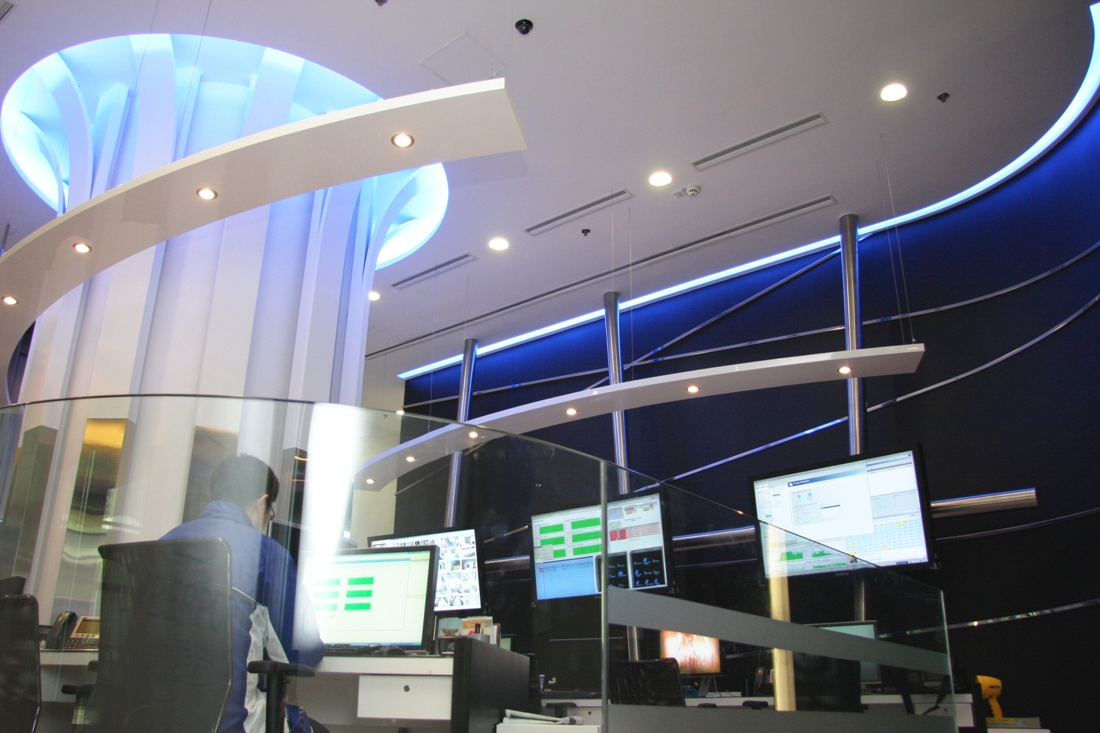
Cyberport Network Operations Centre

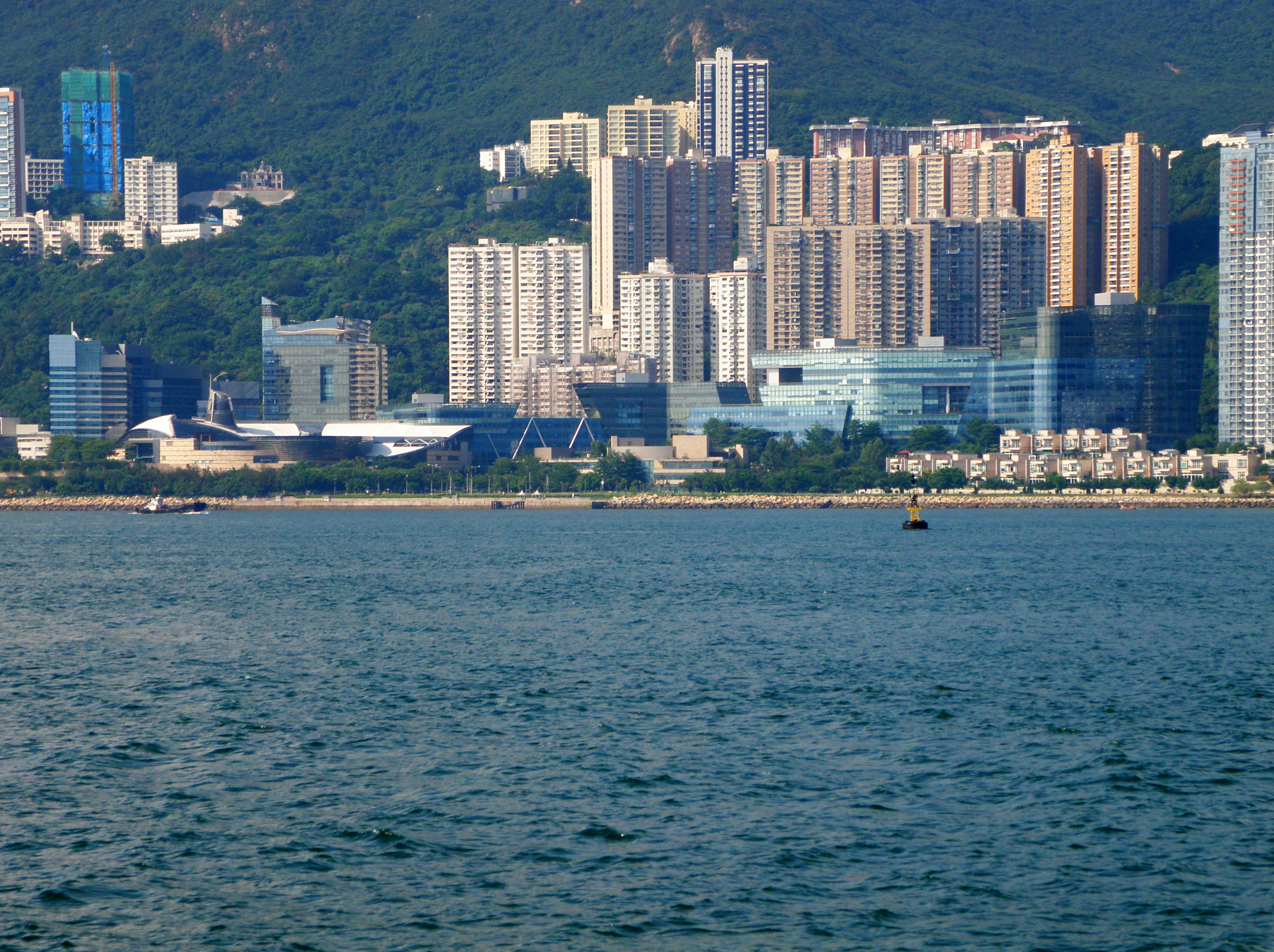
Cyberport

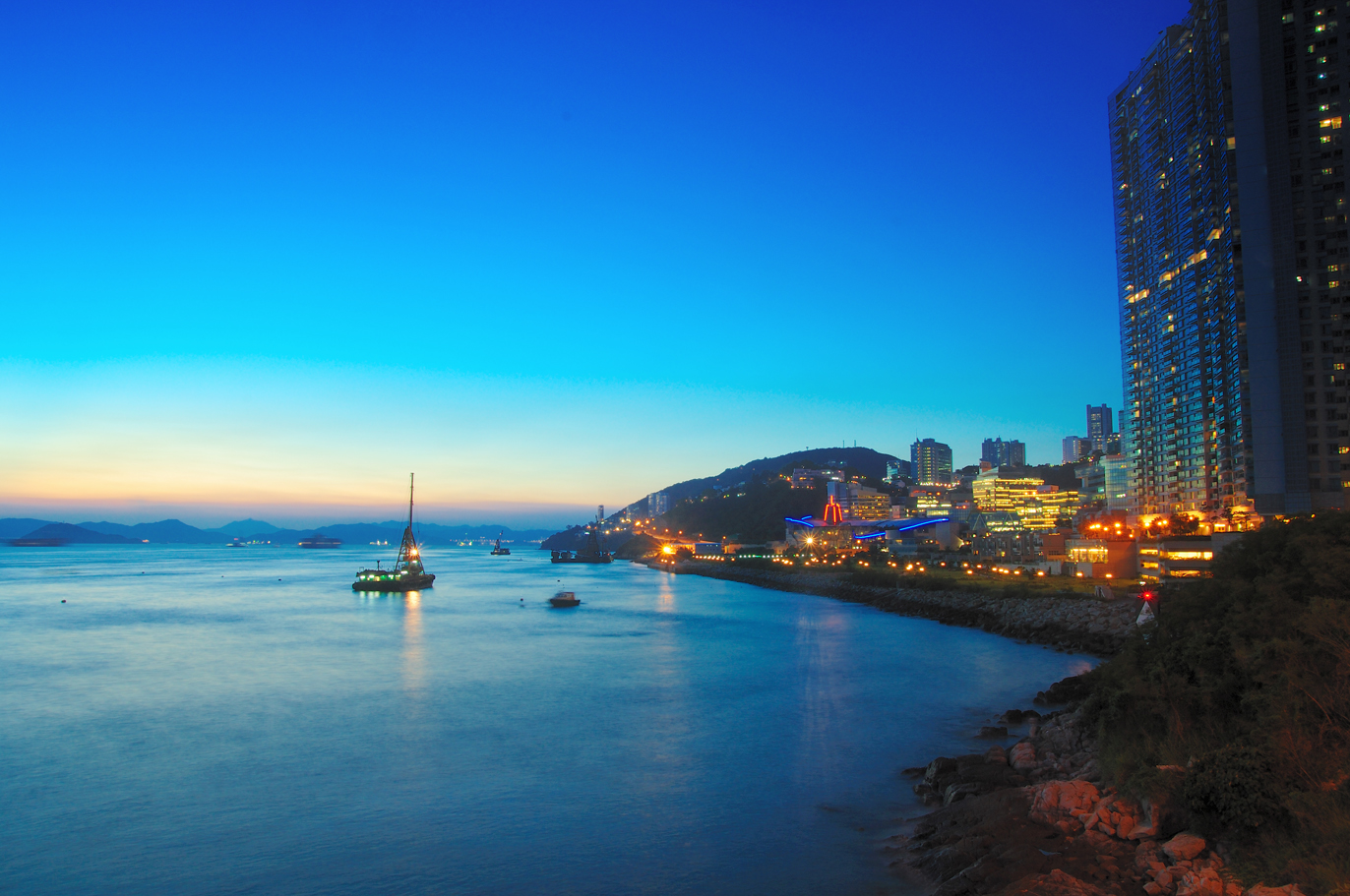
Night view of Cyberport

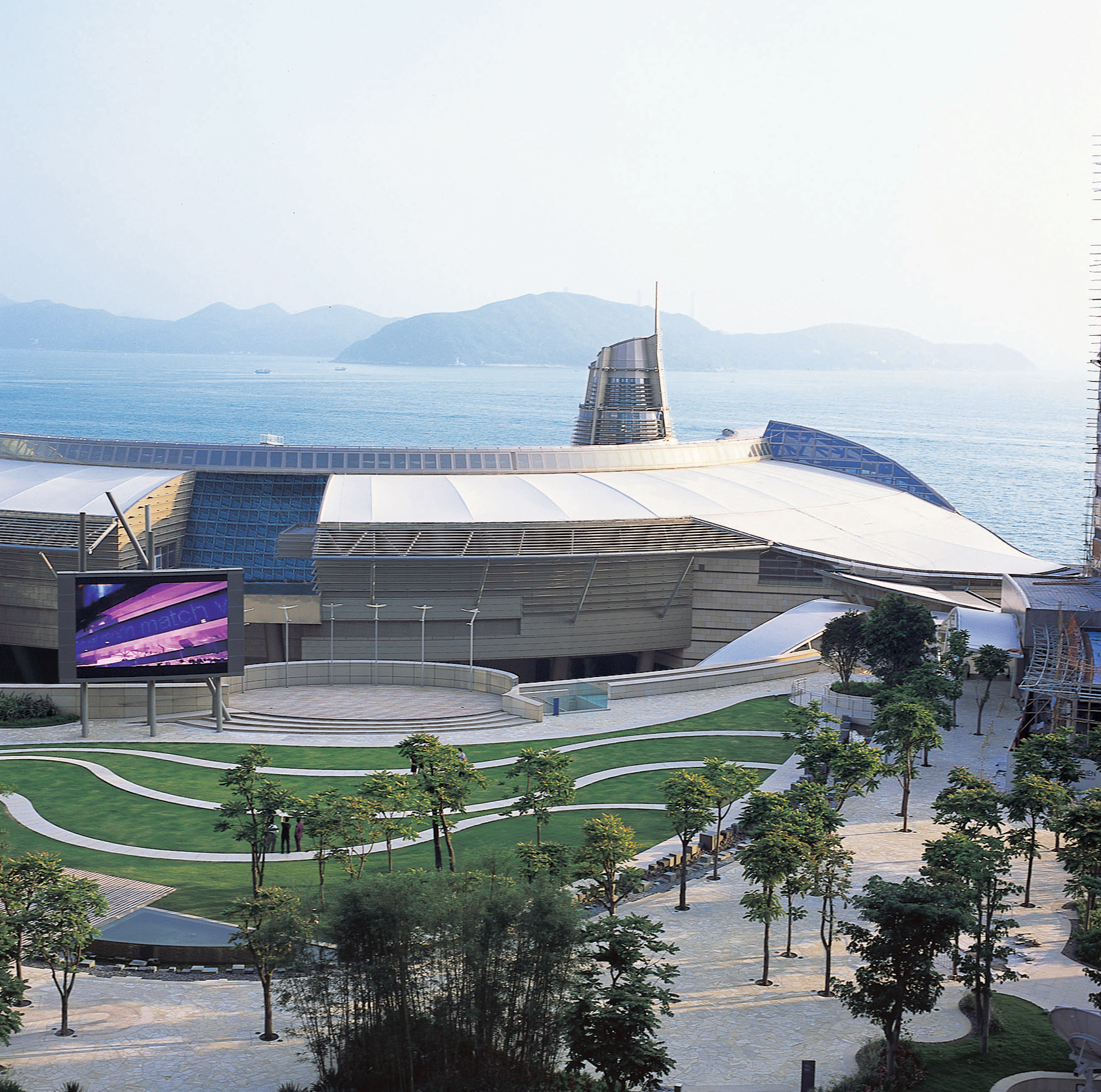
Cyberport and The Podium

Cyberport (Chinese: 數碼港; Jyutping: sou3 maa5 gong2) is a business park in Southern District, Hong Kong, consisting of four office buildings, a hotel, and a retail entertainment complex. It describes itself as a digital technology community with over 1,800 (800 on-site and 1,000 off-site) digital and technology companies.

The Cyberport project has courted controversy since its inception because of the government bypassing the open-tender process in awarding the project to real estate developer Richard Li Tzar-Kai, and also because of its reliance on "ancillary residential" revenue. In recent years, Cyberport has developed as a digital technology flagship and key incubator for entrepreneurship in Hong Kong.

== Digital technology community ==
Six start-ups from Cyberport, namely GOGOX, KLOOK, WeLab, TNG, Animoca Brands and ZA International, have emerged as "unicorns", spanning categories of fintech, smart living, digital entertainment and esports. Cyberport is managed by Hong Kong Cyberport Management Company Limited, which is wholly owned by the Hong Kong SAR Government.

In operation since 2004, Cyberport focuses on fintech, smart living, digital entertainment and esports, greentech, AI and big data, blockchain, and cybersecurity. Cyberport is currently home to the largest Fintech community in Hong Kong with around 400 Fintech companies. Bowtie Life Insurance, a member of the Cyberport community, was authorised by the Hong Kong Insurance Authority to become Hong Kong's first virtual insurer under the Fast Track system in November 2018. Zhong An and WeLab, who are also members of Cyberport, were two of the initial eight financial institutions and firms to be granted a virtual bank license.

To promote the development of esports in Hong Kong, Cyberport launched the opening of Hong Kong's largest professional-grade esports venue on 16 July 2019 located in the Cyberport Arcade. It also launched the Esports Industry Facilitation Scheme and the Esports Internship Scheme. The former offers cash grants to support industry activities, while the latter provides a cash subsidy for internships in the esports industry.

As of February 2022, Cyberport Incubation Programme had incubated and funded over 1,000 technology start-ups companies since its inception in 2005. The Cyberport Macro Fund was announced in 2016 to support local start-ups after seed stage but generally before or around Series A stage of funding. The fund, which received a further injection of HK$200 million by Cyberport and its scope extended to cover Series A and later stage investments, has, as of July 2022, invested in 22 start-ups totalling about HK$168 million, driving a co-investment ratio of 1:8.

On 25 March, the Hong Kong SAR Government announced that Simon Chan Sai-ming would succeed Dr George Lam as chairman of the board of directors of the Hong Kong Cyberport Management Company Limited from 1 April 2022 to 31 March 2024.

Cyberport currently comprises four phases, providing a total of 119,000 square metres of office space. As of May 2021, the occupancy rate of Cyberport's office and co-working space has consistently maintained occupancy rates at 90% and 95%, respectively. The number of applications for the "Cyberport Incubation Programme" has substantially increased from less than 100 per year before 2011 to over 600 per year in recent years.

Cyberport is expanding significantly, with Cyberport 5 expected to open in early 2026, bringing an additional 66,000 square metres of gross floor area to the campus,.

== Project background ==
In March 1999, the Hong Kong government announced its intention to develop a "Cyberport", to help local businesses capitalise on the rapid growth of the Internet. The government called it a development where information technology and multimedia would be nurtured so that future demands of these industries could be met. According to the press release by the Commerce and Economic Development Bureau, only one-third of the site would be residential, the sale of which would help finance the Cyberport development. The Cyberport is billed as home to an incubator for ICT startups, providing office space, financial aid, training, micro fund and network access to the investment community.

The Hong Kong government signed a partnership deal with the Pacific Century Group (PCG) to develop a 26-hectare (64-acre) site with open sea view at Telegraph Bay in Pok Fu Lam, Hong Kong Island, at a total cost of HK$13 billion. It was announced as part of the 1999 budget by then-Financial Secretary Donald Tsang. It was also hoped that this development would help the HKSAR's economy rebound after the 1997 Asian financial crisis, and bring a "strategic cluster of information technology and services companies situated in a world-class setting". The "strategic telecommunication node" was due to be formed due to its close proximity to the proposed "Teleport" in Chung Hom Kok. Touted benefits include "a range of shared facilities for tenants, including a multimedia-based network, telecommunication links, media laboratory, cyber library and other information technology and services support facilities. There will also be educational, entertainment and recreational facilities related to information technology and services for local visitors and tourists".

As part of the deal, PCG would construct a 92,000-square-metre (990,000 sq ft) office complex with a 28,000-square-metre (300,000 sq ft) shopping mall and a 173-room hotel that would be put out to management. Title to these properties would be transferred to the government at zero cost, while PCG received land for 420,000 square metres (4,500,000 sq ft) of residential housing in exchange, and would reap 64.5 percent of the profits from their sale.

The construction of the Cyberport portion consisting of four office buildings, The Arcade and Le Meridien Cyberport Hotel, was completed in phases between 2002 and 2004. The residential developments consist of approximately 2,800 units or houses completed in phases between 2004 and 2008.

Since its opening in 2004, Cyberport has evolved into a digital innovation hub. It currently nurtures companies with a focus on fintech, AI, blockchain, and digital entertainment. The development remains a key government initiative to drive Hong Kong’s innovation and technology sector, supported by incubation programmes, venture funding, and facilities.

== Controversies ==
=== Awarding the project without formal open tender ===
The government's decision in granting the project to Pacific Century Group (PCG) controlled by Richard Li, son of Hong Kong's wealthiest man Li Ka-shing, to develop the site generated much controversy. Awarding the project to PCG without a formal open tender attracted criticism for lack of transparency; other interested developers complained of being sidelined. Three private and wholly owned companies, namely, Hong Kong Cyberport Development Holdings Limited, Hong Kong Cyberport Management Company Limited and Hong Kong Cyberport (Ancillary Development) Limited (collectively referred to as the "Cyberport companies") were set up under the Financial Secretary Incorporated (FSI) to oversee implementation of the project. The project was criticised as unnecessary government intervention in the real estate sector.

=== Residential project disguised as tech hub ===
According to critics, Cyberport was a residential project in disguise, as it arguably failed in its mission to become a high-technology hub for the city. Eurasia Review suggested that the government land was injected into the project below value. The overall rationale of the project has been questioned by its critics, as details have emerged about the planning and budgeting for the project that indicate that 75% of the area developed is residential, and that office space for the technology companies was only about 17% of the total. Also the "shared facilities" made up only part of a small 18,000-square-metre (190,000 sq ft) block which includes houses and apartments.

=== Low occupancy of rental office towers ===
The project had the reputation of a "ghost town", as the government-owned portion suffered low occupancy. Fifteen companies signed letters of intent with the developer, including Hewlett-Packard, IBM, Microsoft and Yahoo, but only three moved in at the initial opening, due to a technology slump. The government rejected accusations of favouritism, arguing that PCG's presence as an anchor tenant would be a marketing plus to prestigious international technology companies. In addition, tendering was bypassed ostensibly to shorten the sensitive time frame to bring forward the economic benefits of the project. PCG later hived off the residential property interests into a shell company separate from the telecoms operation so that the shell company would receive the residential housing sales revenues; it was also accorded right of first refusal to redevelop sites of 60 existing telephone exchanges of PCCW, the telecoms operator. In October 2004, David Webb cited lack of transparency in the government's business dealings and demanded audited financial accounts and directors' reports for three companies related to the project to be released under the non-statutory Code on Access to Information.

=== Data hack ===
In September 2023, media reported that Cyberport had suffered a hack, where the attackers took around 400GB of personal data. Cyberport initially declined to reveal that personal information was exposed, saying it did not want to cause "unnecessary concern." A cybersecurity expert said "This attack could have been avoided because the loopholes and incorrect settings that enabled the attack are from two to three years ago, if not earlier. This should not have happened." A former employee of Cyberport said "There has been no apology from the management, no one has had to step down. They are only issuing statements and holing up."

Cyberport CEO Peter Yan King-shun said that the hack was limited to "some information stored in some parts of some servers" and said there was no evidence of human error; a former employee said "[Yan] didn't acknowledge Cyberport's lack of cybersecurity measures to protect staff and start-ups' information. He didn't apologise. Only the chairman sort of apologised."

SCMP released an editorial, saying "The delay in disclosing last month's incident underlines the lack of urgency and sensitivity on the part of management. This was also reflected in a suggestion that data was stolen from a shared drive with presumably less protection."

=== Expansion ===
In 2019, after the government announced the Cyberport Expansion project, Cyberport repeatedly promised to consult with local residents and the Southern District Council regarding the design of its waterfront park. However, in September 2023, local media reported that Cyberport had declined to attend the Meeting of the Economy, Development, and Planning Committee of the Southern District Council both in 2021 and 2023.

In June 2021, District Councilor Paul Zimmerman manually photographed each page of Cyberport's expansion plans, as they had refused to provide a digital copy. Later in 2023, Zimmerman revealed 8 broken promises and lies made by Cyberport, and said "It is regrettable that Cyberport and ITIB have continuously failed to honour their commitments to consult the community on the park's redesign. With a project of HK$5.5 billion impacting such a beloved park, it is disconcerting that Cyberport, with its technological prowess, has been unable to create a dedicated website providing comprehensive information, visuals, timelines, and contacts. The exclusion of the Pokfulam community from the park's design process, along with the restriction of their participation, is simply unjust."

== Housing ==
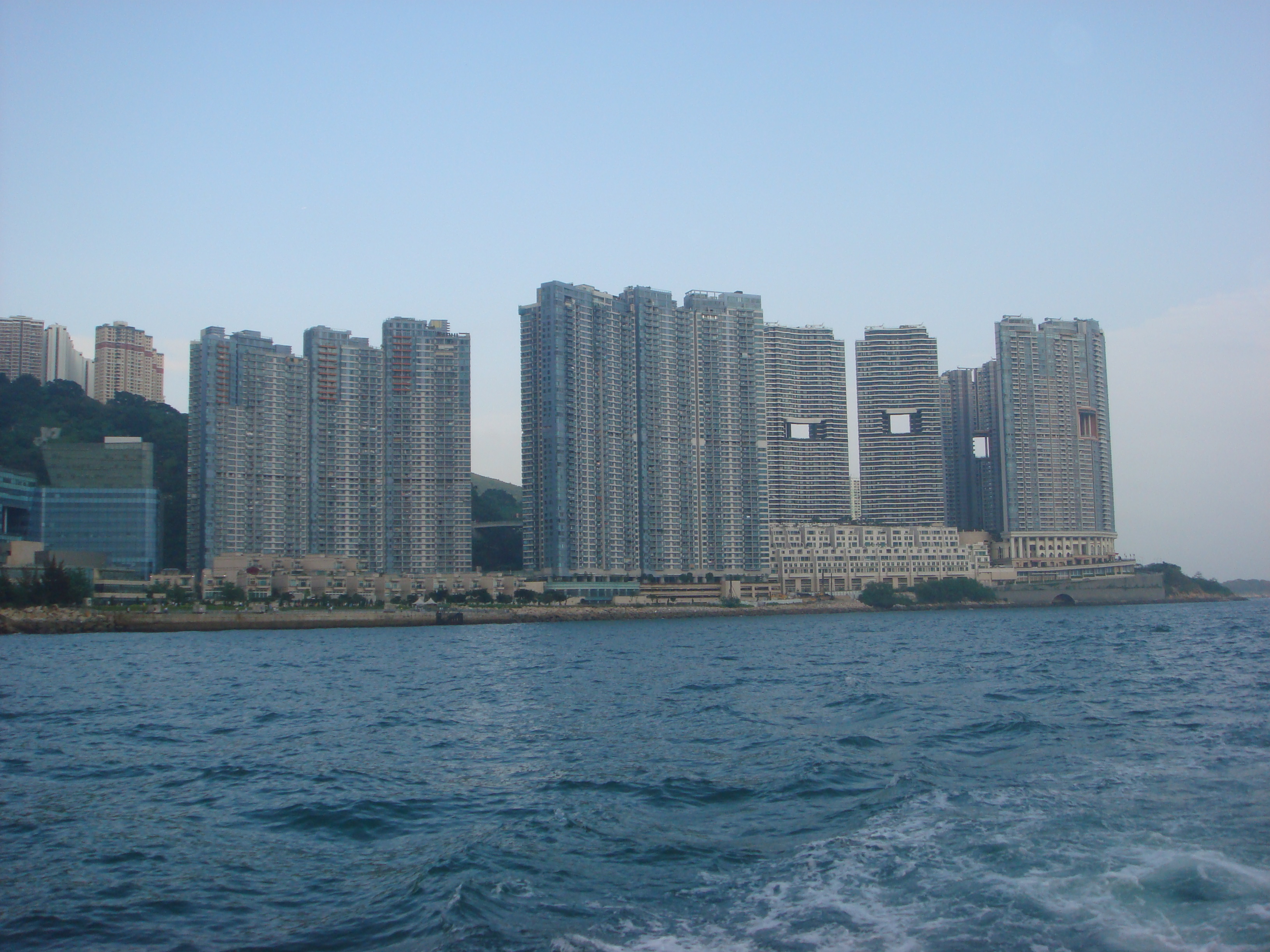
Residence Bel-Air

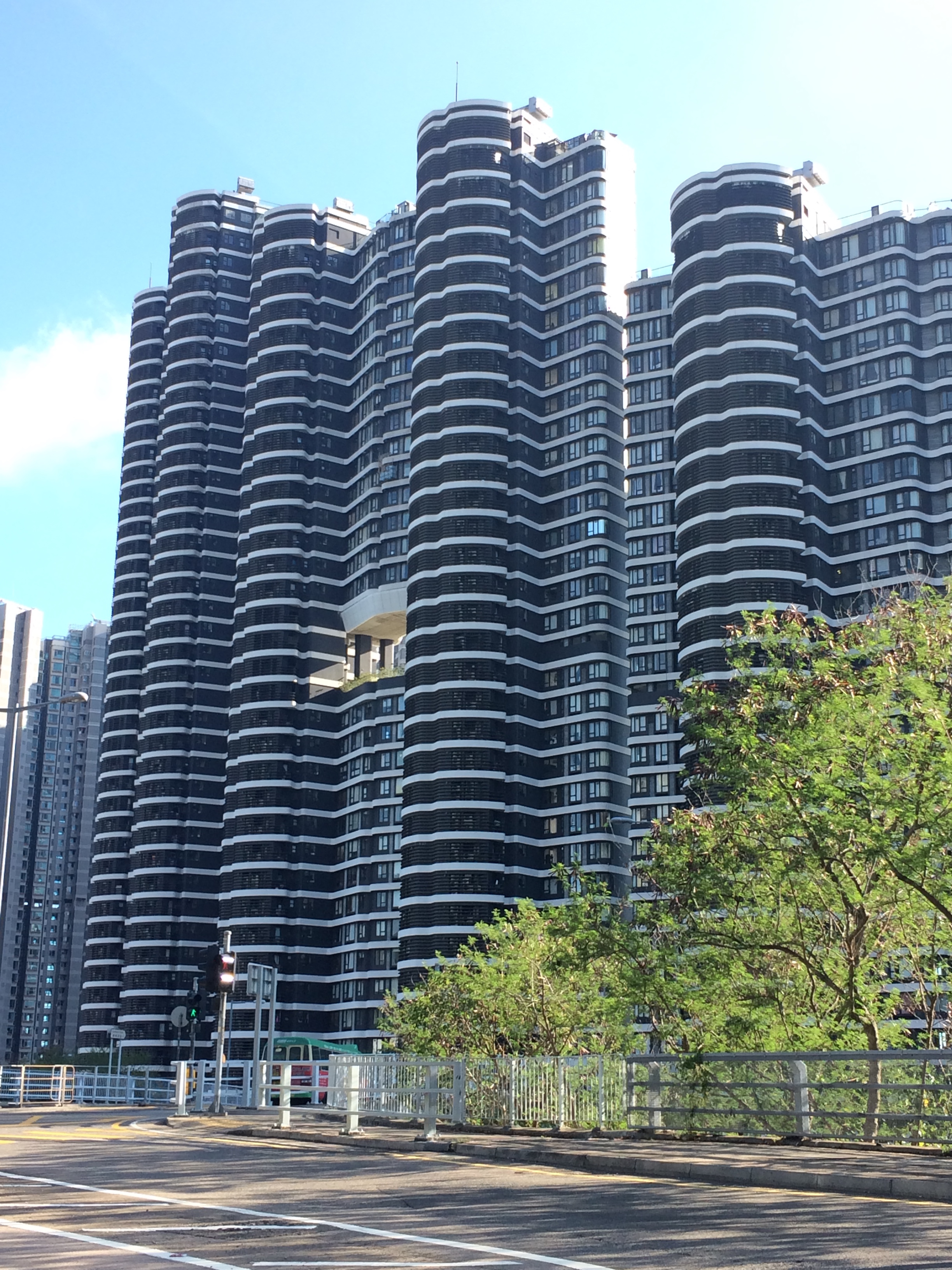
Bel-air Residence Phase 6

Bel-Air
- Traditional Chinese: 貝沙灣
Transcriptions
Yue: Cantonese
- Yale Romanization: Bui sāa wāan
- Jyutping: Bui3 saa1 waan1

Bel-Air is a luxury residential development in Cyberport. The development is split into six phases; phase 1 and 2 are referred to as Residence Bel-Air and Phase 3 is referred to as Bel-Air on the Peak. Phase 1 and 2 each have a clubhouse and seven blocks that are about 48 floors tall. Floor 40 and above are flats that have the area of two flats combined into one, creating over 3,200 square feet (300 m^{2}). All of which feature sky gardens with ocean views. Enumeration of "Block 4" and all fourth floors of each block has been avoided for superstitious reasons. However, the management company neglected to omit 4 when naming the construction phases.

Each floor of "Bel-Air on the Peak" has two or three apartments, two larger units, 'A' and 'C' and a smaller two-bedroom unit 'B'. The clubhouse of "Bel-Air on the Peak" is significantly newer with more artistic features. They maintain an indoor pool, gym, restaurant, snooker room and children's game room.

Bel-Air has 2 clubhouses: the Bay Wing and Peak Wing. They feature a spa, indoor and outdoor swimming pools, game's room, gym, children's playroom, restaurant and personal cinema. Each floor of the "Residence Bel-Air" has two flats with three bedrooms, a kitchen and a balcony. Additionally, there are single-family homes near "Residence Bel-Air".

== Gallery ==
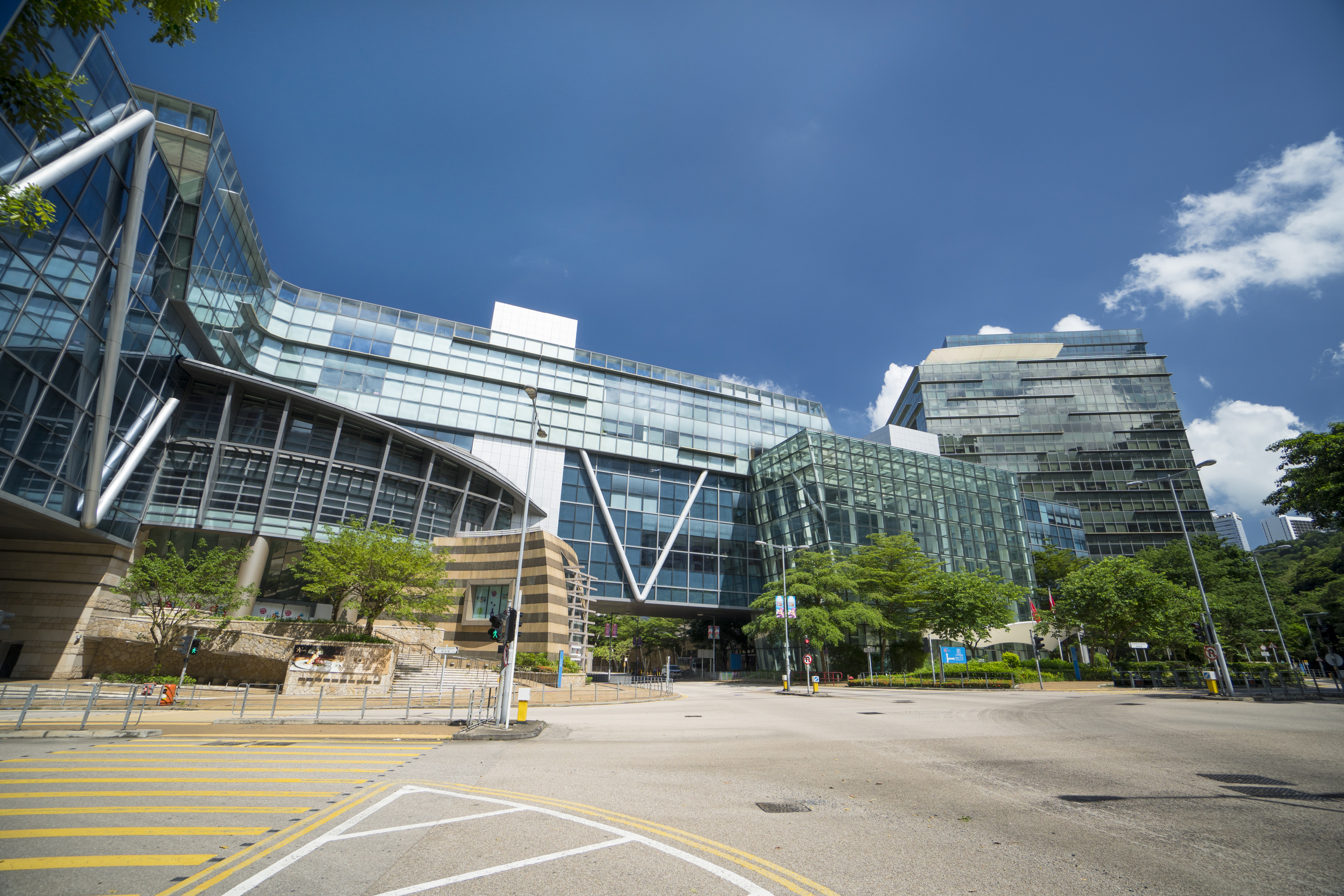
Entrance

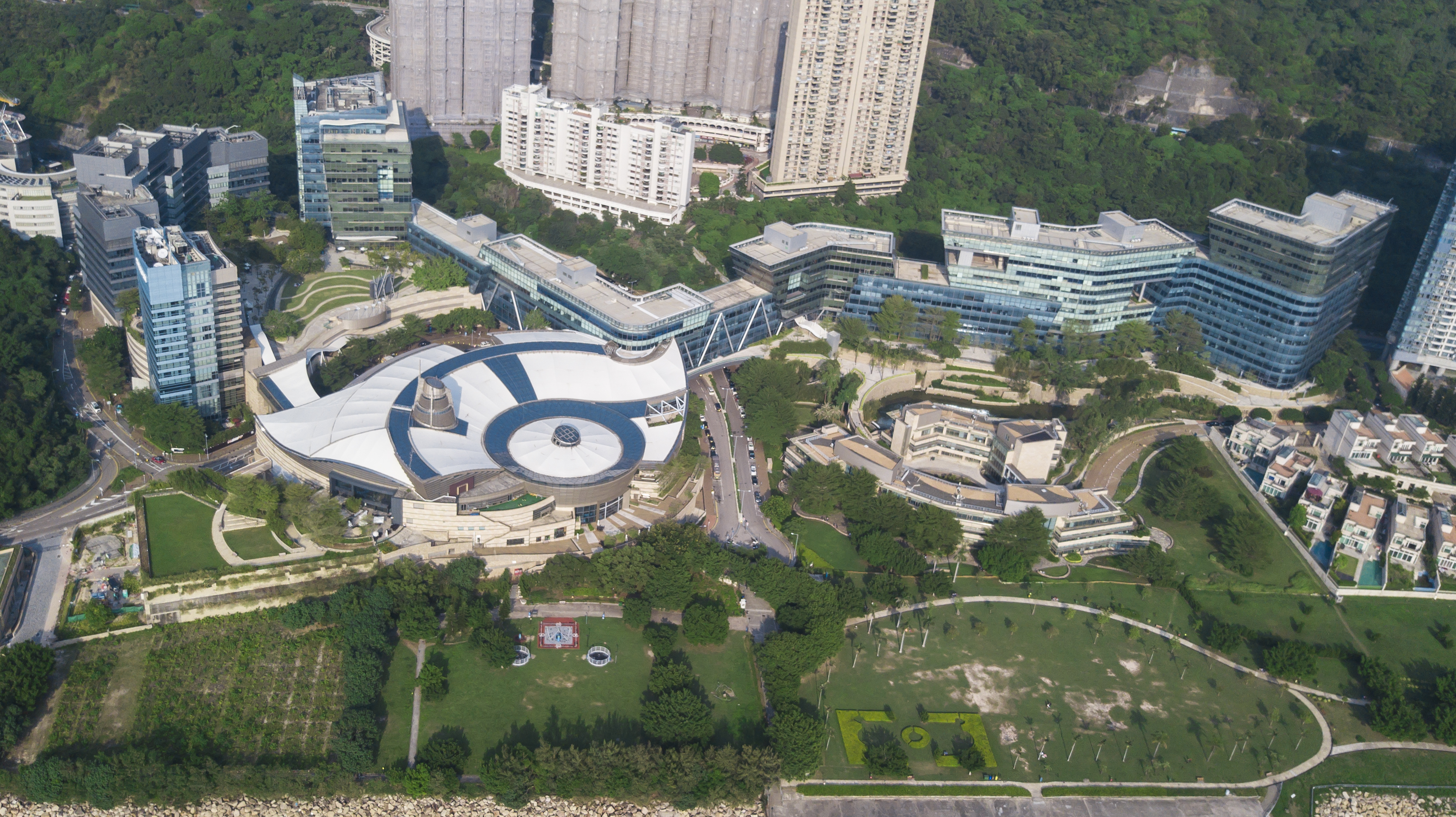
Aerial view

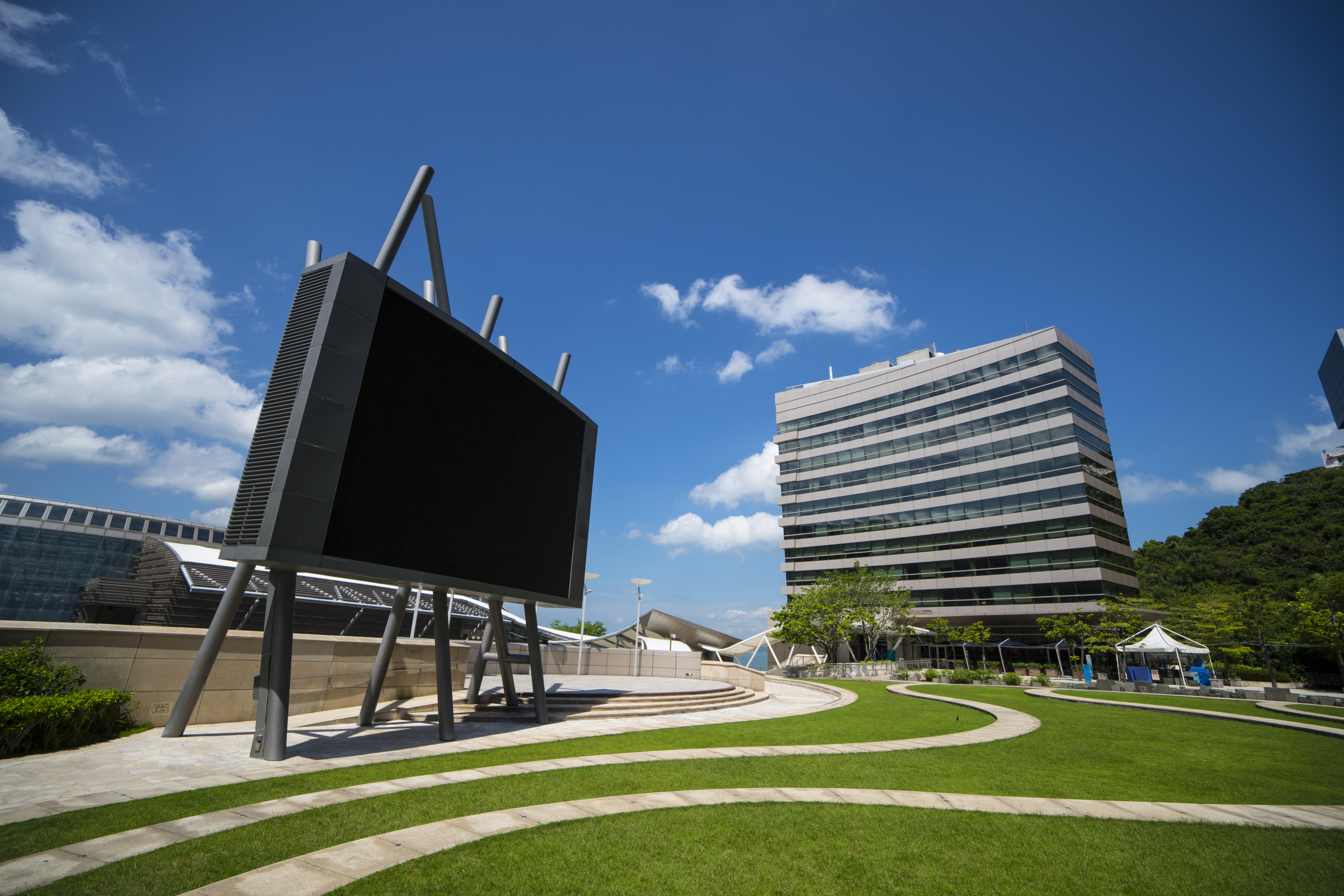
Cyberport 2

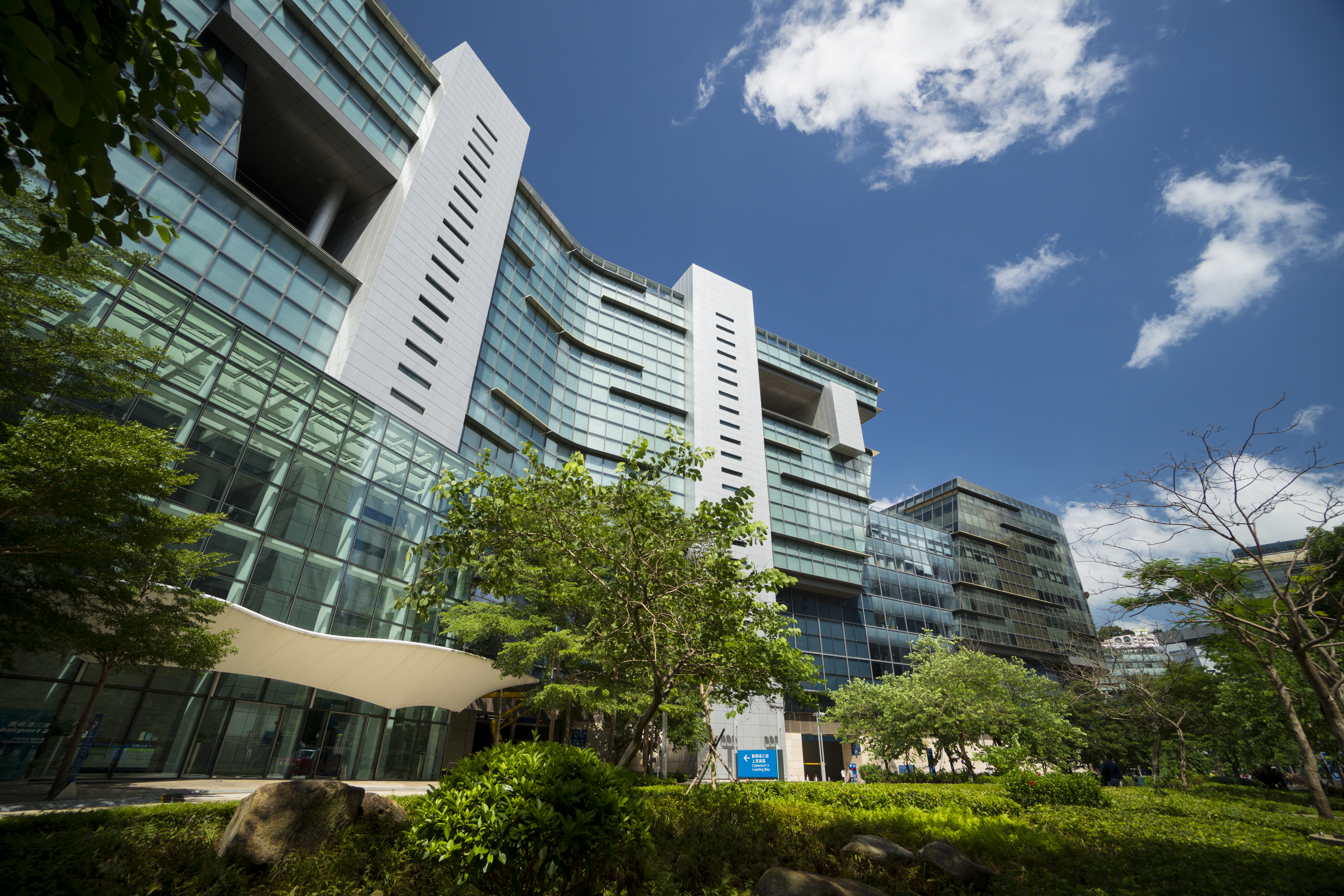
Cyberport 3

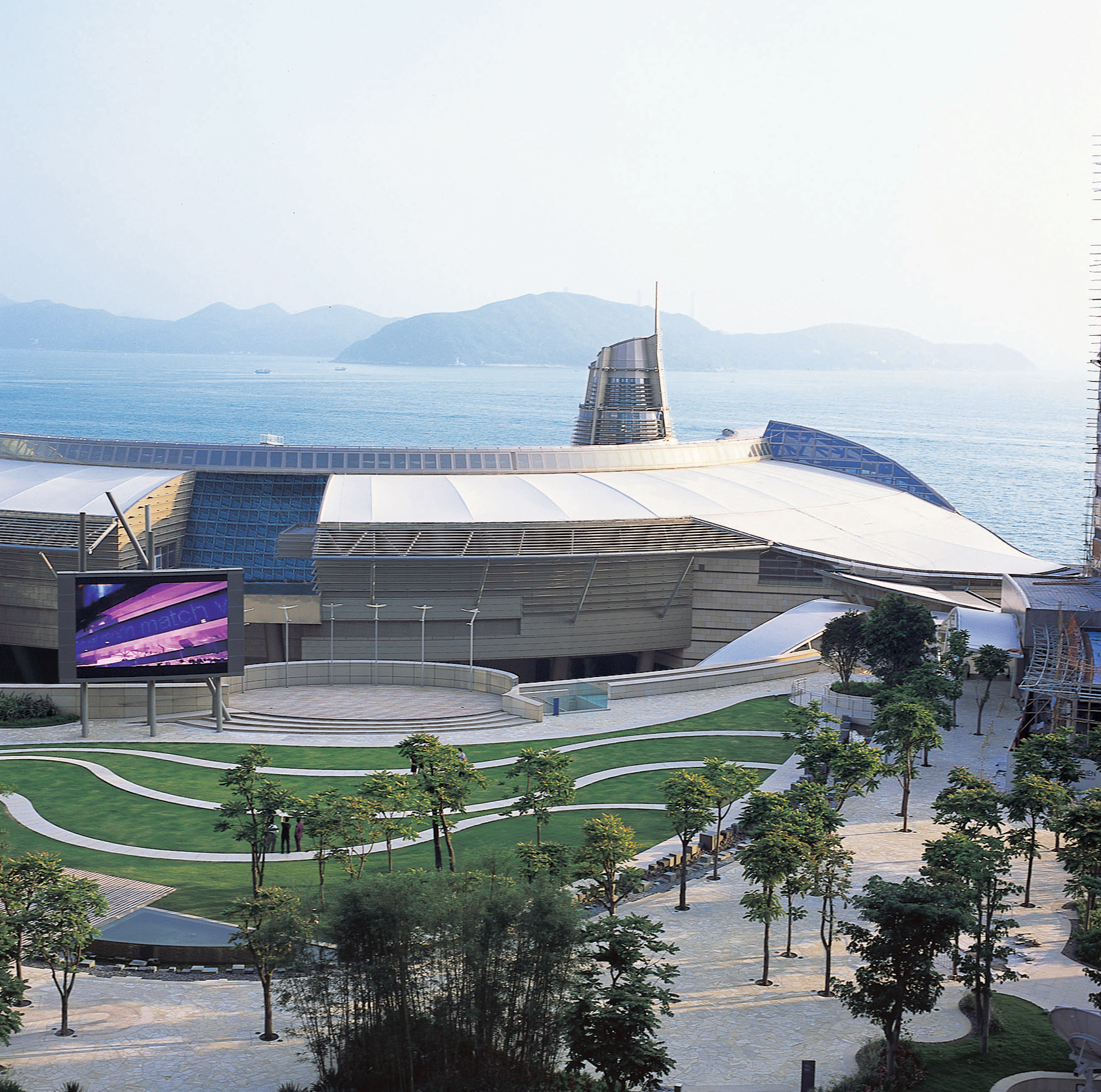
The Podium and Arcade

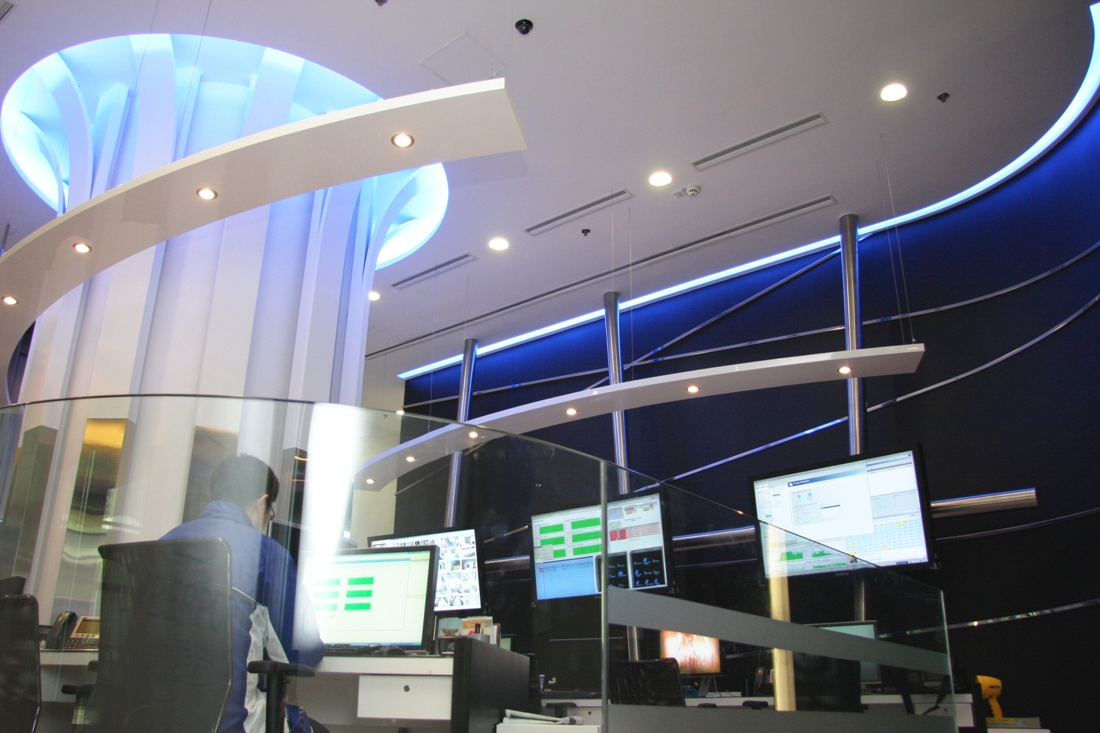
Network Operations Centre of Cyberport

== See also ==
- Hong Kong Free Press – a digital news outlet operating from Cyberport
- Jolla – R&D centre located in Cyberport
- Sailfish Alliance – a group in which Cyberport Hong Kong is one of the partners
- ZA Bank (ZA International) - One of Hong Kong’s first licensed virtual banks
