= Telegraph Bay =

Bay on the west shore of Hong Kong Island

Coordinates: 22°15′30″N 114°7′45″E

- Bay
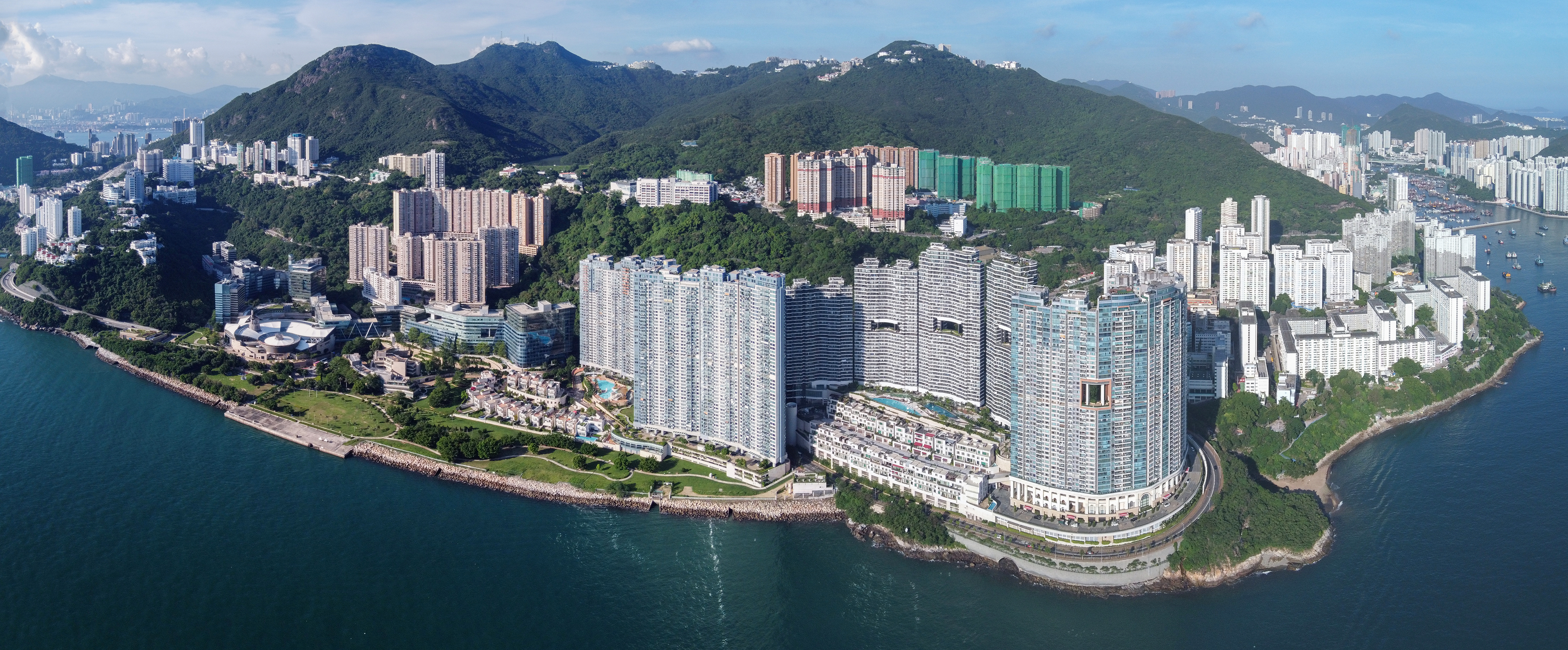
- Telegraph Bay

- Location within Hong Kong
- Coordinates
- Location: Southern District, Hong Kong

Telegraph Bay or Kong Sin Wan (Chinese: 鋼綫灣), formerly known as Tai Hau Wan (大口環), is a bay in the west shore near Pok Fu Lam, between Sandy Bay and Waterfall Bay on the Hong Kong Island, Hong Kong. It is where the Cyberport is located.

== History ==
In the early colonial days, the bay is marked as Taihowan Bay, a spelling variant of Tai Hau Wan. The name Telegraphy Bay suggested that it is where the telegraph cable linked to overseas in late 19th century by Cable and Wireless' Hong Kong operations.

The indigenous name, Tai Hau Wan (大口灣), means big mouth bay. It is now mistakenly referred to the north end of the bay as Tai Hau Wan (大口環), that is Sandy Bay (沙灣), a small bay in adjacent to. Note that character 灣; wan; 'bay' is mistakenly written as 環; wan; 'circle'.

The endemic species of Bauhinia blakeana was first discovered near the bay.
