= Telecommunications industry in Hong Kong =

The Office of the Telecommunications Authority (OFTA) is the legislative body responsible for regulating the telecommunications industry in Hong Kong. The OFTA has liberalized all telecom sectors and there are no foreign ownership restrictions.

In the local fixed-line market there is neither a pre-set limit on the number of licenses issued nor deadline for applications. As of 2004, there were nine fixed-line licensees: PCCW-HKT, New World Telephone Limited, Wharf T & T Limited, Hutchison Global Crossing Limited, Hong Kong Broadband Network Limited, Eastar Technology Limited, CM Tel. (HK) Limited, TraxComm Limited and HKC Network Limited. Consequently, the telephone density is, with 56 lines per 100 people, among the highest in the world.

As of 2004 there are 197 licensed Internet service providers (ISP) in Hong Kong, providing dial-up or broadband services. Hong Kong is the second after South Korea in terms of broadband penetration rate (53%).

With regard to mobile services, the OFTA awarded four 3G licenses in 2001: Hong Kong CSL Limited, Hutchison 3G (HK) Limited, SmartTone 3G Limited and Sunday 3G (HK) Limited The first 3G mobile services were launched in January 2004. Moreover, these four 3G operators, together with New World Mobility and Peoples Telephone Company Limited operate a total of eleven GSM networks. Thus the mobile density as of 2004 is one of the highest in the world (106.3%).

== Telecommunication company ==
As of July 2017, the penetration rate in Hong Kong was estimated at 240.8% over a population estimate of over 7.325 million. Hong Kong's telecom regulator is the Office of the Communications Authority (OFCA).

Rank	Operator	Technology	Subscribers (in millions)	Ownership
1	CMHK(China Mobile Hong Kong)	GSM-1800 (GPRS, EDGE) 2100 MHz UMTS, HSPA+, DC-HSPA+ 900/1800/2100/2600(B7)/2300(B40) MHz LTE-A	8.274 (June 2017)	China Mobile
2	HKT(including csl, 1O1O and Club SIM)	GSM-900/1800 (GPRS, EDGE) 900/2100 MHz UMTS, HSPA+, DC-HSPA+ 900/1800/2600(B7) MHz LTE-A	4.324 (Dec 2018)	PCCW Limited (Pacific Century Group 28.97%, China Unicom 19.9%)
3	3 Hong Kong	GSM-900/1800 (GPRS, EDGE) 900 MHz UMTS, HSPA+, DC-HSPA+ 900/1800/2100/2600(B7)/2300(B40) MHz LTE-A	3.276 (Dec 2018)	Hutchison Telecom
4	SmarTone	GSM-900/1800 (GPRS) 850/2100 MHz UMTS, HSPA+, DC-HSPA+ 900/1800/2100/2600(B7) MHz LTE-A	2.47 (Dec 2018)	Sun Hung Kai Properties
5	CUniq HK (China Unicom Hong Kong)	Using 3 Hong Kong	0.87(Oct 2018)	China Unicom
6	Hong Kong Broadband Network	Using CMHK and SmarTone	N/A	HKBN Ltd.
7	SUN Mobile	Using CSL Mobile	N/A	HKT (60%), Telecom Digital (40%)
8	Birdie Mobile	Using SmarTone	N/A	SmarTone Mobile Communications Limited

== See also ==
- Communications in Hong Kong
- Economy of Hong Kong
