= New World Telecommunications =

Asian telecommunications company

- Trade name: New World Telecom
- Formerly: New World Telephone
- Company type: subsidiary
- Industry: telecommunications
- Predecessor: Rowenty Power
- Founded: 14 January 1992 in British Hong Kong
- Defunct: 2016
- Fate: acquired by Hong Kong Broadband Network
- Successor: HKBN Enterprise Solutions
- Headquarters: Hong Kong S.A.R., China
- Owner: New World Development
- Parent: New World Development; (via New World Telephone Holdings)

Chinese name
- Traditional Chinese: 新世界電訊
- Literal meaning: New World Telecommunications
Transcriptions

former Chinese name
- Traditional Chinese: 新世界電話
- Literal meaning: New World Telephone
Transcriptions
- Website: newworldtel.com

New World Telecommunications Limited (abb. NWT) also known as New World Telecom, was a fixed line provider of Hong Kong S.A.R., China. It was a subsidiary of New World Development, via New World Telephone Holdings; New World Telecommunications was acquired by a competitor, Hong Kong Broadband Network (HKBN) in February 2016. In the same year New World Telecommunications was renamed to HKBN Enterprise Solutions, as a subsidiary of HKBN.

== History ==
New World Telecommunications was established in 1992 by transforming from Rowenty Power, a shelf company that was incorporated on 14 January of the same year in the British Hong Kong. At that time it was known as New World Telephone. New World Telephone Holdings was the direct parent company, while itself a subsidiary of New World Development. New World Telecommunications acquired the licence of fixed-line telephone in 1995.

Immediately after the deregulation of the telecommunication industry of Hong Kong in 2003, New World Telecommunications, along with Hutchison Global Communications, Wharf T&T, were the major competitors to PCCW (formerly Hong Kong Telecom), the dominant operator at that time. New World Telecommunications was aimed for business customers.

New World Telecommunications had a sister company New World PCS Holdings which was a mobile network operator in Hong Kong. They both under the same direct parent company New World Telephone Holdings. However, New World PCS Holdings was sold to Asia Logistics Technologies in 2004, as part of a backdoor listing. Asia Logistics Technologies was subsequently known as New World Mobile Holdings from 2004 to 2010. However, the shares of the successor of New World Mobile Holdings, CSL New World Mobility, was sold by New World Development to Hong Kong Telecom, a subsidiary of PCCW in 2013.

In February 2016, New World Telephone Holdings sold New World Telecommunications and other businesses in Hong Kong, Macau and Shenzhen to its competitor Hong Kong Broadband Network (HKBN) for HK$650 million; the latter was disinvested by local telecommunication tycoon Ricky Wong in 2012. It was reported that the takeover of New World Telecommunications was a leverage buyout, which was financed by a borrowing from JPMorgan Chase for 5 years by HKBN. In March 2016, the Communications Authority of Hong Kong, announced that they would not to commence an investigation on the takeover under the Competition Ordinance of Hong Kong. It was reported that despite both HKBN and NWT were telecommunication companies, due to one company aimed at residential customers and another aimed at business customers, it would not strengthen the oligopoly of the telecommunications market of Hong Kong.

Financial Times compared the disinvestment of Hutchison Global Communications by CK Hutchison Holdings in 2017 and New World Telecommunications by New World Development, were part of "the process of succession planning [of the largest tycoon families of Hong Kong] as the founders reach retirement age or pass away."; Cheng Yu-tung, the founder of New World Development, died in September 2016. The disinvestment was also rumoured as part of a total withdrew of Hong Kong market (Chinese: 撤資), nevertheless the analyst concluded that the disinvestment by New World Development, was part of a project that strengthen the core business of the conglomerate.
