= Communications in Hong Kong =

Communications in Hong Kong includes a wide-ranging network of radio, television, telephone, Internet, and related online services, reflecting Hong Kong's commerce and international importance.

There are some 60 online newspapers (in various languages, but mostly in Traditional Chinese) and the numbers of online periodicals run into the hundreds. The territory is in addition the East and Southeast Asian headquarters for most of the major international communications and media services.

Broadcast media and news is provided by several television and radio companies, one of which is government-run. Television provides the major source of news and entertainment for the average family. Chinese television programs are produced for both local and overseas markets.

Hong Kong also ranks as an important centre of publishing and printing: numerous books are published yearly for local consumption, several leading foreign publishers have their regional offices in Hong Kong, and many international magazines are printed in the territory.

== Radio ==
- 5 radio networks, one of which is government-funded, operate 30 radio stations (2014)
- Radios: 4.45 million (1997)

== Television ==
=== Terrestrial television ===
There are a total of nine terrestrial television channels in Hong Kong, owned by three television networks, one of which is a public broadcaster.

Hong Kong's terrestrial commercial TV networks can also be seen in Macau, via cable.

==== TVB ====
Television Broadcasts Limited operates TVB Jade, TVB Pearl, TVB Plus (formerly two separate channels, TVB J2 and J5), and TVB News, of which Jade and Pearl are available on analogue frequencies. TVB is the city's first commercial terrestrial television network (Asia Television (ATV) began as a subscription television network), and is the city's predominant TV network.

==== HKTVE ====
HK Television Entertainment operates ViuTV, which is a Cantonese general entertainment channel. The network is mandated by its service license to launch a 17-hour English television channel on or before 31 March 2017. The English channel named "ViuTVsix" officially launched on March 31, 2017 (local time).

ViuTV does not broadcast on analogue frequencies.

==== RTHK ====
Public broadcaster RTHK operates three digital channels, two of which have been simulcast on analogue frequencies formerly used by ATV since April 2, 2016.

=== Paid television ===
Paid cable and satellite television have also been widespread, with Cable TV Hong Kong, Now TV, TVB Network Vision and HKBN bbTV being the more prominent providers.

The production of Hong Kong's soap drama, comedy series and variety shows have reached mass audiences throughout the Chinese-speaking world. Many international and pan-Asian broadcasters are based in Hong Kong, including News Corporation's STAR TV.

== Telecommunication industry ==
- Telecommunications system: modern facilities that provide excellent domestic and international services.
- Domestic: microwave radio relay links and extensive fibre-optic network
- Satellite earth stations – 3 Intelsat (1 Pacific Ocean and 2 Indian Ocean)
- International coaxial cable: to Guangzhou, China; access to 5 international submarine cables providing connections to ASEAN member nations, Japan, Taiwan, Australia, Middle East, and Western Europe

The Hong Kong telecommunication industry was deregulated in 1995. There are no foreign ownership restrictions. The Office of Telecommunications Authority (OFTA) is the legislative body responsible for regulating the telecommunications industry. Competition in this sector is fierce. Since 2008, one can get 10 Mbit/s up and down unlimited VDSL, telephone line rental, unlimited local calls, and 100 minutes of international calls for US$25/month. Telephone line rental and unlimited local calls is only US$3/month.

=== Telecommunication company ===
As of July 2017, the penetration rate in Hong Kong was estimated at 240.8% over a population estimate of over 7.325 million. Hong Kong's telecom regulator is the Office of the Communications Authority (OFCA).

Rank	Operator	Technology	Subscribers (in millions)	Ownership
1	HKT (including csl, 1O1O and Club SIM)	GSM-900/1800 (GPRS, EDGE) 900/2100 MHz UMTS, HSPA+, DC-HSPA+ 900/1800/2600(B7) MHz LTE-A	4.324 (Dec 2018)	PCCW Limited (Pacific Century Group 28.97%, China Unicom 19.9%)
2	3 Hong Kong	GSM-900/1800 (GPRS, EDGE) 900 MHz UMTS, HSPA+, DC-HSPA+ 900/1800/2100/2600(B7)/2300(B40) MHz LTE-A	3.276 (Dec 2018)	Hutchison Telecom
3 (?)	CMHK (China Mobile Hong Kong)	GSM-1800 (GPRS, EDGE) 2100 MHz UMTS, HSPA+, DC-HSPA+ 900/1800/2100/2600(B7)/2300(B40) MHz LTE-A	5 (Jun 2021)	China Mobile
4	SmarTone	GSM-900/1800 (GPRS) 850/2100 MHz UMTS, HSPA+, DC-HSPA+ 900/1800/2100/2600(B7) MHz LTE-A	2.47 (Dec 2018)	Sun Hung Kai Properties
5	CUniq HK (China Unicom Hong Kong)	Using 3 Hong Kong	0.87(Oct 2018)	China Unicom
6	Hong Kong Broadband Network	Using CMHK and SmarTone	0.277(Oct 2019)	HKBN Ltd.
7	SUN Mobile	Using CSL Mobile	N/A	HKT (60%), Telecom Digital (40%)
8	Birdie Mobile	Using SmarTone	N/A	SmarTone Mobile Communications Limited
9	CTExcel		N/A	China Telecom

=== Telephone ===
- International dialling code: +852
- Telephones – main lines in use: 4.345 million, 37th in the world (2009)
- Telephones – mobile cellular: 13.416 million, 54th in the world (2009)
- Major fixed-line operators: PCCW
- Major cellular operators: 3 Hong Kong, SmarTone, CSL, China Mobile Hong Kong

=== Internet ===
The Chinese University of Hong Kong established Hong Kong's first internet connection in September 1991. In 1992, it was shared by all higher education institutions as Hongkong Academic and Research Network (HARNET).

Between 1992 and 1995, Hong Kong had the highest internet penetration rate in Asia.

As of 2021, 93.1% of Hong Kong's population above the age of ten had used the internet within the previous 12 months.

Selected statistics:

- Number of Internet users: 4,920,255 or 69.4% of the population (2010)
- Number of Internet hosts: 861,516 hosts, 48th in the world (2010)
- IPv4 addresses allocated: 11,777,024 or 1,646 per 1000 population (April 2012)
- Internet Service Providers (ISPs): 179 (May 2007)
- Dial-up access accounts: 0.99 million (Mar 2007)
- Country code (Top-level domain): .hk

==== Broadband Internet access ====
- Fixed broadband subscriptions: 2,111,109 or 29.93 per 100 inhabitants (2010)

As of April 2006, HKBN offers its customers Internet access with speeds starting from 10 Mbit/s up to 1000 Mbit/s (1 Gbit/s) via Fiber to the building and Fiber to the Home. However the speed to non-Hong Kong destinations is capped to 20 Mbit/s. As of November 2009, the company was offering 100 Mbit/s service for HK$99 (about $13 US) per month.

Major Internet Service Providers (ISPs) include:

- PCCW Netvigator, with a 95% coverage area and providing internet access to 1.9 million users. ADSL connections, speeds up to 8M/800K are priced differently. Newly constructed apartments have ADSL2 and VDSL connections, which have speeds up to 100M/100M. FTTH for last mile broadband of speeds up to 10G/10G. Business plans have speeds up to 10G/10G.
- HGC ADSL & VDSL & FTTH broadband of speeds up to 1G/1G.
- ADSL & VDSL broadband of speeds up to 10M/10M.
- HKBN Metro Ethernet (CAT-5E/FTTH for last mile) broadband of speeds up to 1G/1G.
- I-cable Broadband Cable HFC Broadband of speeds up to 200M/10M shared by one tower (tens of apartments) and FTTH Broadband of speeds up to 1G/1G.

==== Internet censorship in Hong Kong ====
Hong Kong law provides for freedom of speech and press, and the government generally respects these rights in practice. Although freedom of expression is protected by the Hong Kong Bill of Rights, the Hong Kong national security law gives the government the power to "take down any electronic messages published" that the government considers endangering national security. No government licenses are required to operate a website. Democratic activists claim central government authorities closely monitor their e-mails and Internet use.

== See also ==
- Media of Hong Kong
- Newspapers of Hong Kong
- Communications in Macau
- List of Chinese-language television channels
- List of telecommunications regulatory bodies
