= Munsang College =

Secondary school in Hong Kong

Coordinates: 22.33196°N 114.18646°E

- 民生書院

Location
- 16-51 East Jordon Road; 8 Dumbarton Road; Kowloon City, Kowloon; Hong Kong; Hong Kong, Hong Kong SAR

Information
- Type: Kindergarten – Private; Primary – Private; Secondary – Aided, Co-ed
- Established: 1926
- School district: Kowloon City
- School number: +852 3655 3300
- Principal: Yip Raymond
- Website: https://www.munsang.edu.hk/secondary/

Munsang College
- Traditional Chinese: 民生書院
- Simplified Chinese: 民生书院
Transcriptions
Standard Mandarin
- Hanyu Pinyin: Mínshēng Shūyuàn
Yue: Cantonese
- Jyutping: man4 sang1 syu1 jyun6*2

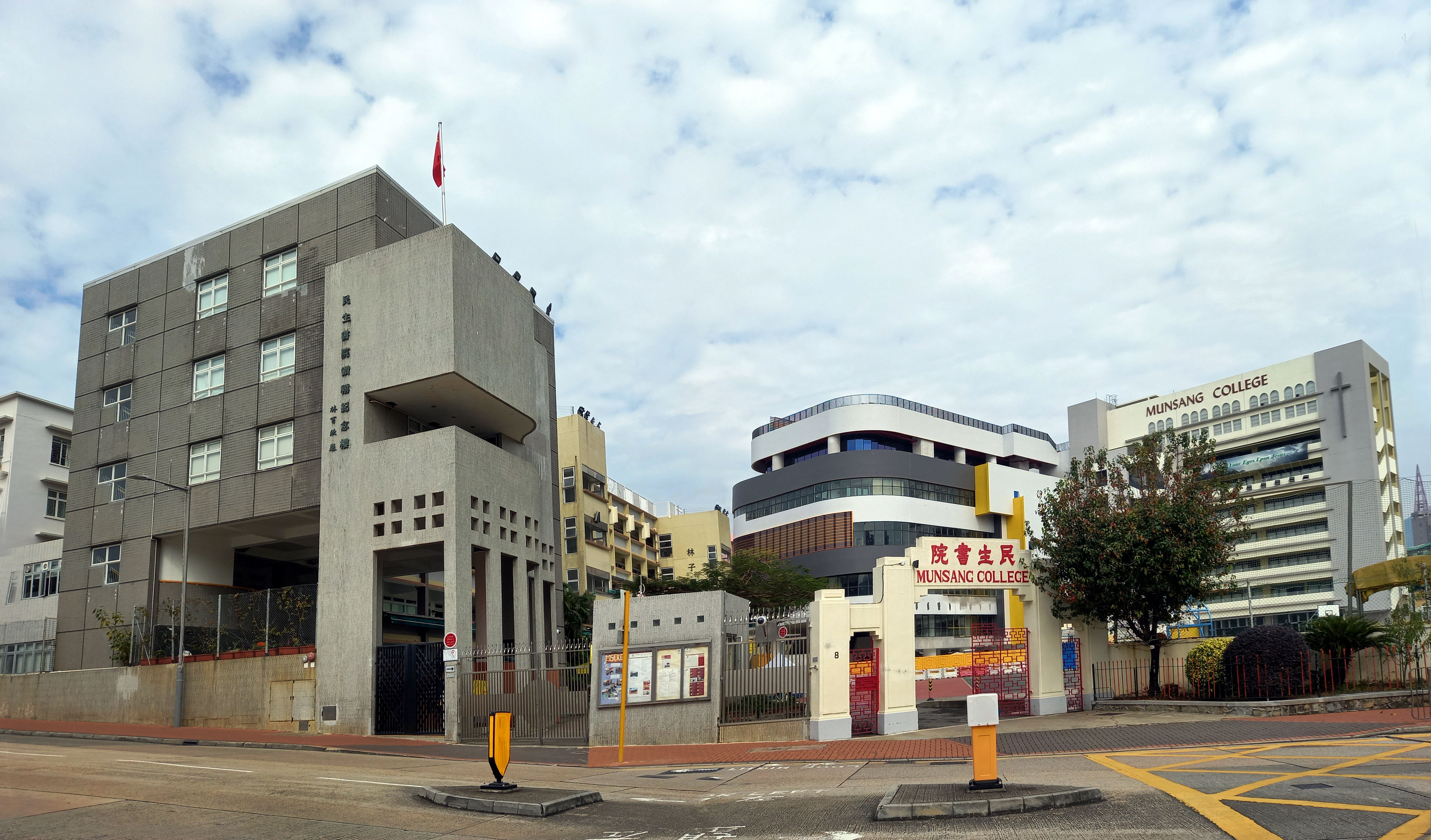
The campus in 2022.

Munsang College (MSC; Chinese: 民生書院) is an eminent EMI college situated in Kowloon City, Hong Kong founded by Mr Au Chak Mun (also known as Au Tak) and Dr Ts'o Seen Wan in 1926. It adopts the house system; each student is assigned to one of six houses, which are named Love, Tak, Chi, Tai, Kwan, May, with colours accordingly as pink, yellow, purple, red, blue, and green.

== History ==
Early years (1916–1939)

In 1916, in view of the lack of schools for children in Kowloon City, Dr Ts'o Seen Wan suggested raising funds to build a school. In 1920, Mr Au Chak Mun (also known as Au Tak), one of the two people who reclaimed the land at Kowloon Bay and founded the Kai Tak Investment Company, died and bequeathed a donation of HK$10,000 to support Dr Ts'o Seen Wan's plan. Later, Mr Mok Kon Sang donated HK$10,000 as the founding fund of the school. Rev. Arthur Dudley Stewart, the Principal of St. Paul's College was entrusted with the work of preparation. In 1924, Mr Rufus Huang, a teacher of St. Stephen's College at Stanley, was appointed as the first principal of the school and he rented a three-storey building at 2 Kai Tak Bun as the school building and the open area near the school building as the playground. In commemoration of the contribution of Mr Au Chak Mun and Mr Mok Kon Sang, the school was named after them as Munsang College.

On 8 March 1926, classes were opened. At that time, there were only 4 teachers and 18 students. Only boys' junior secondary section was set up. There was one class each in junior 1, 2 and 3. Besides, there were three preparatory classes, Pre A, B and C for children who didn't reach the level of junior one. That winter, the Board of Directors was set up and Dr Ts'o Seen Wan became the chairman of the board. Since then 8 March has been the School Anniversary date. In 1927, the kindergarten section was set up. There were totally 60 students in the secondary section and 17 students in the primary and kindergarten sections. In 1928, the boys' senior secondary section was set up. Owing to the increasing number of students, No 45 and 47 of Kai Yan Road near Kai Tak Bun were rented as school buildings. The ground floor was with classrooms for the primary and kindergarten sections. The second and third floors were used as the students' dormitory. In 1930, the first 3 students graduated in the secondary section. In 1932, a girls' secondary section was set up and the number of students increased to 426. In 1933, a hall with a capacity of 200 students was built at the back of the main school building at Kai Tak Bun. In 1934, owing to the outstanding performance of Munsang College, the Hong Kong Government started to subsidize the school (special grant school). In the autumn of 1937, the girls' secondary section was closed and all female students were transferred to Heep Yunn College. In 1938, the first Home-Coming day was held.

Relocation (1939–1940)

In the preparation of the 16th-anniversary ceremony, it was suggested that a piece of land at the end of Grampian Road should be bought to build a school campus instead of renting houses. HK$11,000 was raised to purchase most of the land for the present campus. In September 1939, the first phase of building the school campus, including a hall and 12 classrooms, at the present location was completed. There were totally 525 students. On 26 November, the Munsang College Alumni Association was founded.

Post-war (1945–1954)

In August 1945, the Japanese army surrendered. However, the school campus was still occupied by the British army. Civilian houses at Hau Wong Road were rented and the primary school resumed. There were totally 94 students. In May 1946, the campus at Grampian Road was returned to the school authority but only the primary section resumed. The number of students increased to 200. In 1947, the main road in the school campus and the school gate was rebuilt. The school applied to the government and became a non-profit-making private school. In 1949, a co-ed secondary section was established. In the summer of the same year, one additional classroom was built and in winter, two extra classrooms were built. In 1950, the Student Association was set up and the total number of students increased to 500. In 1953, with the addition of seven classrooms, the secondary school resumed up to S5 and there were totally 17 classes and 785 students. In 1954, five students participated in the first English HKCEE after World War II.

Expansion (1955–1962)

In 1955, the kindergarten section resumed and a new building with 6 classrooms for the kindergarten section was completed in January 1956. The first phase of building the present Block D was completed in November 1957. In 1961, the sports ground was expanded with extra land leased from the Hong Kong Government after the completion of Dumbarton Road and its area was increased to about 20,000 square feet (1,900 m^{2}). At the same time, Munsang College was classified as a private aided school by the Education Department.

In 1962, the present Block C and the other classrooms of Block D were completed. There were 6 kindergarten classes, 29 primary classes and 12 secondary classes. The total number of students was in 2030.

Modern era (since 1963)

S6 classes and S7 classes resumed in 1963 and 1964 respectively. In that year, there were 19 secondary classes, 30 primary classes and 8 kindergarten classes. In 1965, the school gate at Inverness Road was completed. In 1968, the old hall was rebuilt and was completed on 9 January 1969. It was later named as Lim Por Yen Hall (Block B). The hall can accommodate 12090 audiences. There are 8 classrooms and a gymnastic room below the hall. The old kindergarten building was rebuilt in 1976 and the primary school was approved to be a feeder school of the secondary school in that year. On 7 March of the same year, the school celebrated its golden jubilee anniversary. There were open days and exhibitions. The new kindergarten/primary section building (Block A) was completed in June 1977. After that, the work of building the Rufus Huang Memorial Building (Block E) was started and it was completed in 1979. In 1980, the construction of a primary school library, a kitchen and a swimming pool was started. On 26 May 1981, the swimming pool was opened. In 1986, to celebrate the diamond jubilee anniversary of Munsang College, a new building, Diamond Jubilee Building (Block F) was built and was completed on 21 December 1986. In 1987, the swimming pool was re-built. In 1988, the Munsang College Alumni Association held the golden jubilee celebration. In 1993, a new laboratory building (Block G) and a new lecture theatre, the Dr Daniel Lam Lecture Theatre, was completed. In 1995, the school carried out extensive renovation work. In order to show the history of our college, the school built an archive. On 8 March 1996, the school celebrated its Seventieth Anniversary. There were open days and exhibitions. The Munsang College Archive was opened. On 7 March 1997, the school celebrated its 71st Anniversary with a time capsule enshrined in the campus. The time capsule will be opened after 50 years.

== Alumni ==
- Rayson Huang (黃麗松) – former Vice-Chancellor of University of Hong Kong
- Lim Por-yen (林百欣) – founder and former chairman of Asia Television
- Ricky Wong (王維基) – chairman and founder of City Telecom Ltd and Hong Kong Broadband Network
- Eric Cheung (solicitor) (張達明) – Principal Lecturer and Director of Clinical Legal Education, Faculty of Law, The University of Hong Kong and solicitor
- David Lam (林思齊) – the 25th Lieutenant Governor of British Columbia
- Lee Cheuk-yan (李卓人) – former member of the Legislative Council of Hong Kong, chairman of the Hong Kong Alliance in Support of Patriotic Democratic Movements in China
- Yip Wing-sie (葉詠詩) – musician and music director of Hong Kong Sinfonietta
- Charles Heung (向華強) – founder of Win's Entertainment and China Star Entertainment Group
- Martin Yan (甄文達) – Chinese-Hong Kong-American chef, food writer and host of Yan Can Cook
- Cass Phang (彭羚) – singer
