= MBK Partners =

South Korean private equity firm

MBK Partners Ltd.
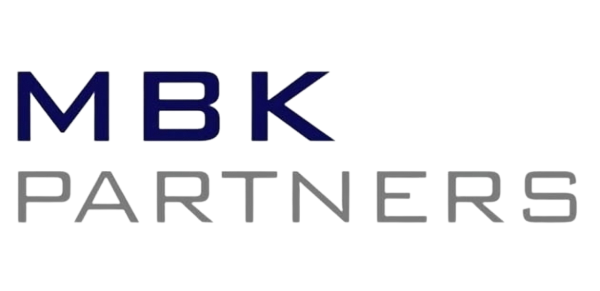
- Type: Private Ownership
- Industry: Private Equity
- Founded: 2005; 21 years ago
- Founders: Michael ByungJu Kim
- AUM: US$33 billion (2026)
- Website: www.mbkpartners.com

MBK Partners (MBKP) is a private equity firm focused on East Asia. According to Forbes, MBK Partners is one of the largest private equity firms in Asia.

In 2023, Private Equity International, ranked MBK Partners as the eighth largest private equity firm in Asia based on total fundraising over the most recent five-year period.

== History ==
MBK Partners was founded in 2005 as a buyout company by Michael ByungJu Kim and several other senior Asian executives from the Carlyle Group.

In January 2022, a 12.5% stake of the firm was sold to Blue Owl Capital (formerly known as Dyal Capital Partners).

MBK Partners' investment focus is in North Asian regions, namely China, Japan and South Korea.

MBK Partners has offices in Beijing, Hong Kong, Seoul, Shanghai and Tokyo.

As of 2017, MBKP manages Special Situations funds that focus on providing capital solutions in North Asia for companies with constrained access to financing due to developmental stage, market cycles, or structural inefficiencies. The firm's Special Situations strategy has included at least two flagship funds, with the first closing at approximately $850 million, and the second raising around $1.8 billion in commitments.

== Funds ==
Fund	Vintage Year	Committed Capital ($m)
MBK Partners I	2005	USD 1,560
MBK Partners II	2009	USD 1,500
MBK Partners III	2013	USD 2,700
MBK Partners IV	2016	USD 4,100
Special Situations I	2018	USD 850
MBK Partners V	2020	USD 6,500
Special Situations II	2020	USD 1,800
MBK Partners VI	2024	USD 5,500

== Notable transactions ==
In May 2009, MBKP and Goldman Sachs acquired a 98.3% stake in Universal Studios Japan for US$1.4 billion.

In August 2013, MBKP acquired ING's South Korean insurance unit for total cash proceeds of 1.84 trillion won ($1.65 billion).

In November 2014, MBKP sold accounting software maker, Yayoi Co to Japanese financial services provider, Orix Corp for 80 billion yen ($691 million).

In October 2016, MBKP and TPG Capital acquired Wharf T&T from The Wharf (Holdings) for HK$9.5 billion ($1.2 billion). In August 2018, Wharf T&T was sold to Hong Kong's telecom operator HKBN for HK$10.5 billion ($1.34 billion).

MBKP took ING Life Insurance Korea (renamed Orange Life) public in May 2017 with a $1.2 billion initial public offering, making it the first company owned by a private equity fund to be listed on the South Korean stock exchange. In September 2018, MBK Partners sold its 59.15% stake in Orange Life to Shinhan Financial Group for 2.3 trillion won ($2.07 billion); the subsequent share swap drew criticism from minority shareholders who argued their holdings were undervalued relative to MBKP’s exit price.

In February 2019, MBKP acquired Godiva Chocolatier's Asian-Pacific operations for $1.5 billion. The firm also acquired a 79.83% stake in Lotte Card, a Korean credit card company, for $986.1 million in 2019.

In 2024, MBKP acquired Hitowa, a living support services provider for $336.2 million, and Alinamin, an over-the-counter supplement manufacturer for $703.7 million. The firm acquired a 71.25% stake in pharmaceutical wholesaler Geo-Young, also in 2024.

In late 2024, MBK Partners and Young Poong Corp. launched a bid for management control of Korea Zinc Inc., accumulating a combined stake of approximately 46%. In December 2025, the Seoul Central District Court rejected their injunction to block Korea Zinc from issuing $1.9 billion in new shares to fund a US smelter project.

In February 2025, MBKP acquired a controlling stake in FICT, a Japanese semiconductor equipment manufacturer.

=== Homeplus investment and restructuring ===
In September 2015, Tesco sold its South Korean business, Homeplus, to a consortium led by MBK Partners for £4 billion.

By 2025, Homeplus entered court-supervised rehabilitation following financial difficulties. According to Reuters, MBK Partners submitted a restructuring plan that included a proposed sale to strategic investors, a partial write-down of its equity stake, and additional financing to support ongoing operations during the process.

In March 2025, Homeplus filed for corporate rehabilitation with the Seoul Bankruptcy Court after a series of credit rating downgrades. South Korean prosecutors subsequently sought arrest warrants for MBK Chairman Michael ByungJu Kim and three other executives on charges of fraud and violation of the Capital Markets Act in connection with the sale of short-term bonds prior to the filing.

In September 2026, the Seoul Bankruptcy Court approved a rehabilitation plan for Homeplus. Under the plan, MBK Partners' entire equity stake in the retailer, with a book value of about ₩2.5 trillion, was cancelled without compensation in October 2026, resulting in a total loss on MBK's investment and ending its ownership and management control of Homeplus. A court-supervised sale process to find a new owner for Homeplus was subsequently launched.

== Recognitions ==
MBK Partners announced in October 2024 that it was selected in the 2024 World’s Best Companies list by TIME and Statista.

In January 2026, MBK Partners was ranked first among 30 private equity brands in South Korea in a survey conducted by the Korea Corporate Reputation Research Institute.
