= Gateway Business Africa =

- Number of employees: 350 employees

Gateway Business Africa (GBA) provides pan-African data hosting services and telecommunications services in 42 sub-Saharan countries and employs 350 people in Africa.
It is a wholly owned subsidiary of the South Africa mobile phone company Vodacom, Gateway Business is the brand name of Vodacom Business Africa, the statutory entity under which it operates. They have offices in Angola, Cameroon, Ghana, Kenya, Mali, Mozambique, Nigeria, Sierra Leone, South Africa, Tanzania, France and the UK.

Gateway Business was formerly a division of Gateway Communications, which was acquired by the Vodacom Group in December 2008 for $675m .

== History ==
In March 2010, as part of Vodafone Global Enterprise, Gateway Business Services won a Five Year Contract to provide Deutsche Post DHL with a managed network.
In August 2010 Gateway Business Africa launched wireless broadband in six states of Nigeria, to be rolled out across the whole of Nigeria. .

In June 2012, Vodacom sold some of the business units of Vodacom Business Africa to PCCW Global, including Gateway Communications.
