= Ricky Wong (Hong Kong businessman) =

Hong Kong telecom and media entrepreneur

Ricky Wong Wai-kay
- 王維基
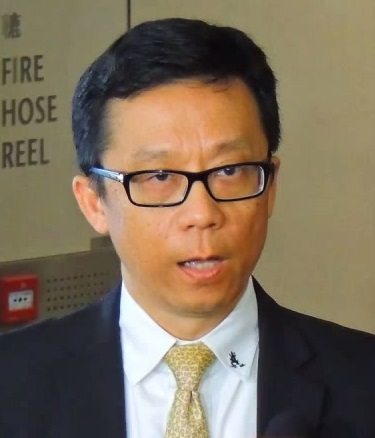
- Born: 13 December 1961 (age 64); Hong Kong
- Citizenship: Chinese (Hong Kong)
- Education: Munsang College; Chinese University of Hong Kong
- Political party: Liberal (until 1996)

Ricky Wong Wai-kay (Chinese: 王維基; Jyutping: wong4 wai4 kei1; born 13 December 1961 in Hong Kong) is a telecom and media entrepreneur in Hong Kong. He is the chairman and founder of Hong Kong Television Network, and the founder of Hong Kong Broadband Network. He is also a member of the Board of Trustees, United College, the Chinese University of Hong Kong.

As an entrepreneur in the telecommunications and technology industries, Wong set up City Telecom (H.K.) Limited (CTI) in 1992, providing alternative international direct dialing (IDD) services at affordable tariffs which broke the predominant market monopoly. In 1999, he established Hong Kong Broadband Network Limited, building a territory-wide fibre network to provide super high speed broadband, telephone and IP-TV services, and led the company to become the second largest IP provider in Hong Kong. In 2010, Wong was voted the 60th most powerful person in Global Telecoms Business by the Global Telecom Business Magazine.

In 2009, Wong's CTI applied for a domestic free television program service licence and in 2012, he disposed all telecom businesses to focus on the development of his television and multimedia businesses, eventually renaming CTI to Hong Kong Television Network (HKTV). However, HKTV's application was subsequently rejected in October 2013, prompting Wong to lead HKTV towards the mobile TV and internet shopping industries.

A former member of the Liberal Party in the 1990s, Wong surrendered his Canadian citizenship and contested the 2016 legislative election in the Hong Kong Island constituency, with the objective to oust Chief Executive Leung Chun-ying, but failed to win a seat.

== Education ==
Wong holds a bachelor degree in electronics engineering and an Executive Master of Business Administration from the Chinese University of Hong Kong.

== Career ==
=== Early years ===
Ricky's entrepreneurship started as early as 17, when he claimed to have started the first private tutoring school for students in Hong Kong, and earned HK$40,000 (US$5128 in the 60s). Also reported in many other interviews by local press through the years, was that Ricky Wong had the business idea of bringing in non-taxed engineering textbooks from Taiwan when he was 21, at his 3rd year at the Chinese University of Hong Kong, which earned him a good fortune and helped fellow undergraduates, at a time when textbooks are rare and expensive locally.

=== IDD ===
Ricky Wong was instrumental to the introduction of callback IDD service to Hong Kong. In the early 90s, IDD was a luxurious service in Hong Kong, costing HK$12 (USD1.5) per minute and was monopolised by Hong Kong Telecom. At the time Ricky Wong migrated to Canada, where the Canadian Government liberalised the telecom market using callback, Ricky Wong and his cousin then wrote to the Hong Kong Government about it, and with the government's confirmation, the cousins brought callback to Hong Kong.

With this new competition, IDD price started to drop over 50%. In March 1998, after lengthy negotiation with the government, Hong Kong Telecom International surrendered its exclusive licence for provision of certain external telecommunication circuits and services, eight years earlier than the scheduled expiry, in return for a cash compensation of HK$6.7 billion. According to official data, cumulative savings resulting from competition in the mobile and IDD service markets have also been substantial, while savings from IDD service were estimated at HK$25.5 billion between 1999 and 2002.

=== Broadband ===
Ricky Wong was also credited for bringing broadband internet to Hong Kong. At the time when the whole city is still wired by traditional copper wires using legacy technology (ADSL), with service speed limited to 1.5 Mbit/s to 6 Mbit/s, Ricky Wong acquired a fixed line service license and began a ten-year project of building an all new network in Hong Kong using fibre optics, of which accumulatively invested over HK$3 billion (US$400 million).

The audacious investment decision was considered impossible by the market and investors, and Ricky Wong's company had lost money for seven years. As the investment project went on, with equipment and technical support from Cisco Systems, Ricky Wong successfully built the largest Metro Ethernet in the world, and launched probably the first 100 Mbit/s & 1000 Mbit/s broadband service for residential use in 2004 & 2005. His company became the second largest service provider in Hong Kong in 2008, the fastest growing service provider in 2009, and targets to overtake the incumbent in 2016.

In 2010 he was awarded the Ernst & Young Entrepreneur of the Year China in the 'Telecom' category.

=== Asia Television ===
On 3 December 2008, Linus Cheung originally hired Ricky Wong to be the chief executive of Asia Television (ATV), which had long been recognised as pro-Beijing. On 4 December, it was announced that both of them would lead the TV station's reform. The station was losing HK$1 million a day after racking up losses of HK$300 million in 2007. After just 12 days Ricky Wong was reported to have resigned from his ATV position., with himself denying that he had ever quit.

=== Hong Kong Television ===
In 2013, City Telecom was renamed as Hong Kong Television Limited (HKTV). Ricky Wong is the chairperson of HKTV and remains in charge of the full operation of HKTV. He initiated the application for broadcast license in 2009, but the application was rejected in October 2013. As a result, operations of HKTV was adversely affected and the company dismissed 320 employers. Wong and the public blamed the government for using a vague and generic phrase "a basket of factors" to refuse its application. He then sought another way for the company to survive.

In December 2013, HKTV acquired a mobile TV licence and the spectrum needed to broadcast, and planned to launch services on 1 July 2014. However, in March 2014, the government refused to accept HKTV's technical proposal on the deployment of DTMB, the mobile TV standard deployed in China. Such matter was brought to court for further judgment.

Despite all these, Wong's actions made him to be named Radio Hong Kong's Icon of the Year in 2013.

In February 2015, Wong led HKTV to seek business opportunities in internet shopping and launched online shopping platform "HKTV Mall". Wong aimed to build the largest and the most diversified in terms of brand names, products and services e-shopping mall in Hong Kong, providing one-stop shop & 24 X 7 services.

HKTV Mall lost HK$200 million a year in the first two years of its operation. In October 2016, Wong launched a physical store of HKTV Mall in North Point to boost its online shopping business, targeted to its 1.23 million registered subscribers.

== Personal life ==
Ricky Wong has a daughter and a son with his first wife Helen, with whom he divorced in 2016. Wong is engaged to Shirley Yuen, former CEO of the Hong Kong General Chamber of Commerce.

Wong is also a columnist with articles published in the local free newspapers The Headline and major financial newspaper Hong Kong Economic Times and its free newspaper arm The SkyPost.

== Political Stance and participation ==
Wong is usually considered as a centrist, but he was supported by the Liberal Party when running in 2016 Hong Kong legislative election.

=== 2019–20 Hong Kong protests ===
In the initial stages of dispute, Wong suggested a limited relation between the Anti-Extradition Law Amendment Bill and his businesses and refused to comment. However, when the dispute were heating up, Wong has asked for government self-control for a few times.

On 19 July, 35 leaders in business and political sectors, including Wong, urged for actual actions by the government to respond to the voice of the society, such as independent investigation of police violence, in the hope of mediating the worsening situation of Hong Kong.

On 9 August, Wong openly criticized for the non-action and lying of police regarding the attacks in North Point and 2019 Yuen Long attack.

On 12 November (2019 Chinese University of Hong Kong conflict), Wong urged the CUHK students and alumnus to go to CUHK and to protect the campus. Wong was filmed in CUHK campus wearing smoke-resisting mask
