= Gateway Communications =

African telecommunications company

- Type: division
- Predecessor: Gateway SA
Founded
1991 in Johannesburg	(as Gateway SA)
2002	(Gateway Communications acquired Gateway SA)
- Defunct: 2012
- Fate: became part of PCCW Global
- Successor: division of PCCW Global
- Area served: United Kingdom; Belgium; France; Mozambique; South Africa; etc.
- Owner: PCCW Global (100%)
- Parent: PCCW Global
- Website: gatewaycomms.com

Gateway Communications, also known as Gateway Carrier Services, was a telecommunication business division . It was acquired by PCCW Global, a division of HKT Limited in 2012. HKT Limited itself was a subsidiary of PCCW. Gateway Global Communications owns one of the largest pan-African telecommunications networks, supplying Africa's foremost mobile operators and ISPs.

== History ==
Gateway Communications provided satellite cellular backhaul; international and regional voice and mobile broadband solutions to Africa. They sold voice and data services to enterprises in 40 countries in sub Saharan Africa. Gateway Communications use satellite, sub sea cable (including SEACOM), wireless and fibre connectivity.

Gateway Communications was the first company to invest in SEACOM, which is bringing 1.28 Tbit/s of capacity to the continent.

In 2007, Gateway Communications used Comtech EF Data's CDM-Qx Satellite Modem for their transponder services. Gateway received an award that known as "Excellence in Innovative Cellular Backhaul Services", from Intelsat in 2008.

Gateway [sic] was bought by Vodacom in August 2008 for US$700 million. Vodafone became the indirect parent company of Gateway Communications in December 2008, after Vodafone increased its shares in Vodacom from 50% to 65%.

In August 2008, Gateway established a regional office for Central Africa in Cameroon.

After the takeover, Vodacom spin off Gateway Communications' business services division, Gateway Business Africa. In 2009, it was announced that the business services division would be merged with Vodacom Business.

In 2010, Gateway Communications was expanded into Guinea and Senegal.

In June 2012 Vodacom sold the division Gateway Carrier Services [sic], including several subsidiaries that named after Gateway Communications, to PCCW Global for a fee of US$26 million (HK$268 million). PCCW Global was the international business division of Hong Kong Telecom (HKT), a Hong Kong telecoms provider.

In the same year, the assets were transferred to Gateway Global Communications which is now operating as a carrier services company, wholly owned by PCCW Global. Gateway Global Communications was formerly known as PCCW Global (UK) Limited.

== Former subsidiaries ==
- Gateway Business Africa

== See also ==
- GS Telecom
