= New World PCS =

Mobile network operator (MNO) of Hong Kong

- New World Mobility logo
- Native name: 新世界流動電話有限公司
- Company type: subsidiary
- Industry: Mobile communication
- Founded: 16 February 1995 in British Hong Kong
- Defunct: 2008
- Fate: merged with sister company
- Successor: CSL Limited
- Headquarters: Hong Kong SAR, China
- Area served: Hong Kong
- Brands: New World Mobility
- Parent: CSL New World Mobility
- Website: http://www.nwmobility.com

New World PCS Limited (abb. NWPCS) was a mobile network operator (MNO) of Hong Kong.

== History ==
group structure in 2005 (some intermediate holding companies were omitted)

New World Development
New World Mobile Holdings
New World PCS
New World Mobility

New World PCS Limited was a subsidiary of New World Development that was incorporated on 16 February 1995. In 1997 the brand New World Mobility was launched.

In 2004 New World Development started to own the MNO via another listed intermediate holding company New World Mobile Holdings. Previously, New World PCS Holdings, the direct parent company of New World PCS, as well as New World Telecommunications, were sister companies that under the same direct parent company New World Telephone Holdings, which in turn it was owned by New World Development.

In 2006, NWPCS merged with Hong Kong CSL to form CSL New World Mobility, an intermediate holding company that was owned by Telstra (76.4%) and New World Development (23.6%). It is no longer the direct subsidiary of New World Mobile Holdings Limited and New World Development.

In 2008 New World PCS Limited was renamed to CSL Limited, with the old CSL (Hong Kong CSL Limited) became its subsidiary. However, the brand New World Mobility was still used by the group in the same year (used by New World Mobility Limited, a joint venture of CSL Limited), which eventually became Sun Mobile in 2014.
