= Linus Cheung =

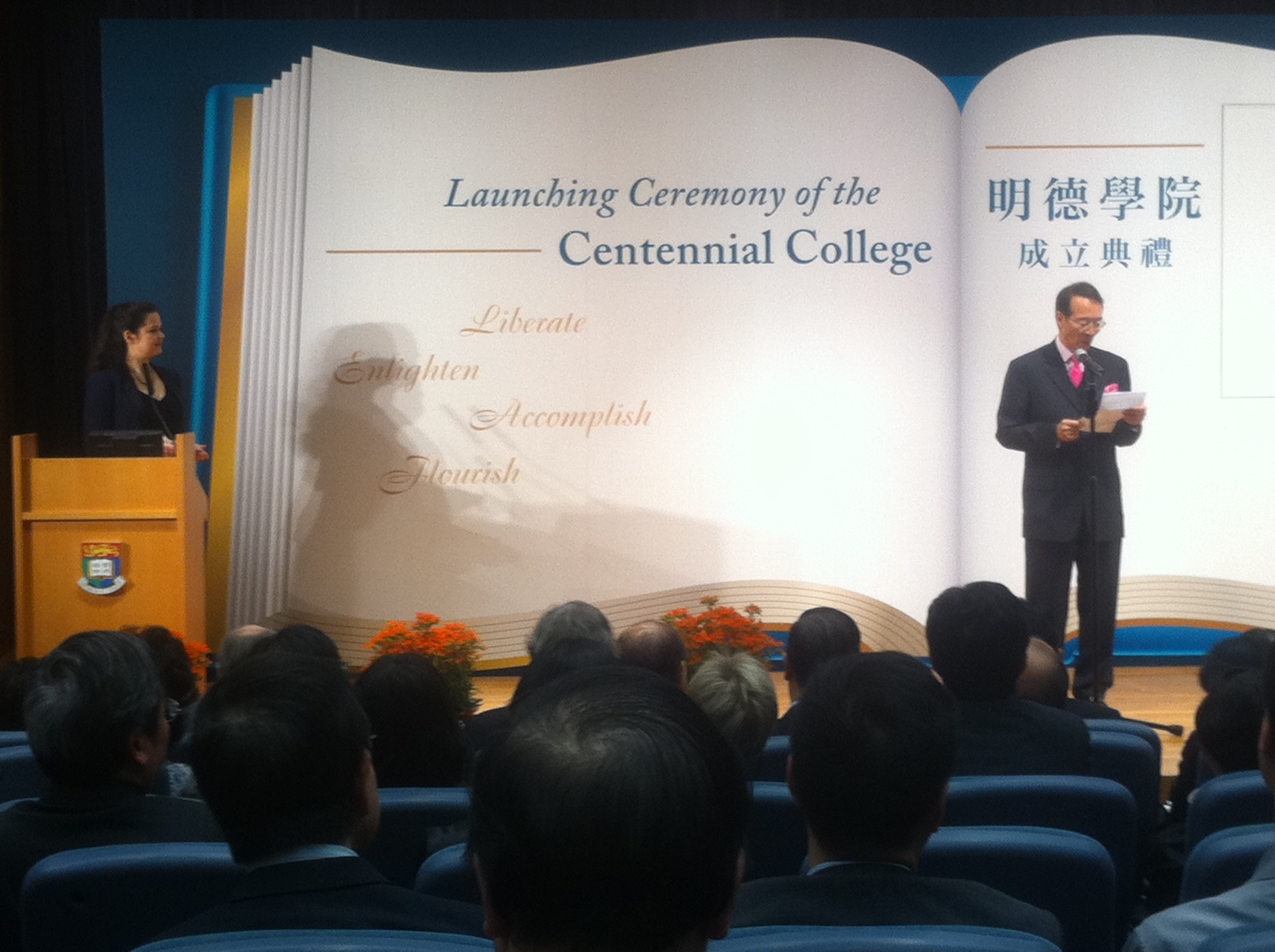
Linus Cheung

Linus Cheung Wing Lam, JP (Chinese: 張永霖) (born 1948 in Hong Kong) was the chairman of Asia Television in 2008–2009, Chief Executive Officer of Hong Kong Telecom (HKT) and executive director of Cable & Wireless plc in the United Kingdom in 1994–2000, following the merger of Cable & Wireless HKT with PCCW Limited (PCCW) in 2000, Linus served as the Deputy Chairman of PCCW until 2004. Prior to joining HKT, Linus spent 23 years at Cathay Pacific, before departing as Deputy Managing Director. Linus then served on the board of China Unicom since 2004 and HKR International since 2006.

Apart from being a businessman, Linus is also known as an art collector. In 2016, Sotheby's elected Linus as its first director from Asia, working with its largest shareholder to add expertise in a major market.

He graduated from the bachelor degree in social science of the University of Hong Kong.

His former wife was Amanda Au Po-ngor, a former civil servant, and his current wife is Helen.

He now hosts a radio programme called "Linus Cheung's World" in RTHK.

== Education ==
THaving earned over $HK 10 million a year serving as the executive officer in Hong Kong Telecom, Linus studied three secondary schools within two years before university. He was transferred from Raimondi College to St' Mark's School during form six and subsequently to St. Stephen's Girls College for no Form Seven studies were available in St' Mark's School at that time.

Before successfully admitted by the University of Hong Kong, he had to walk through the arduous two-year secondary path. Even attending university, another problem came to get Linus – he worried for the expense of ten dollars a day - half for dormitory fee and half for expenses of dining and had to earn it on his own. For the sake of the expenses, he taught English in the Western Kai Fong Welfare Association Social Service Centre during the nighttime.

Linus also claims that the key to success is persevered efforts. Exemplified by his own case, Linus knew only a little of Putonghua over 10 years after his graduation from university. He started from the basics and practiced Putonghua. He can now read articles and talked with friends for three hours in Putonghua with native tongue.

== Career ==
=== Early years ===
In 1960s, Linus Cheung studied at Raimondi College for his secondary education. After his graduation from the Department of Economics and Political Science in the University of Hong Kong in 1971, Linus joined Cathay Pacific Hong Kong and worked for it for 23 years. He has served as the deputy managing director of Cathay Pacific and was invited by David Clive Wilson, Baron Wilson of Tillyorn, the then Governor of Hong Kong to temporarily transfer to and work in Hong Kong government's Central Policy Unit on a full-time basis in 1989.

=== Hong Kong Telecom ===
Linus became the chief executive officer of Hong Kong Telecom in 1994.

In 1998 and 1999, Linus was rated as "The Best Telecom CEO in Asia" by the magazine “Telecom Asia” for two years in a row. In 1999, Linus was rated as "The Best Executive in Hong Kong" in a campaign jointly held by DHL and the South China Morning Post. In 2000, Cable & Wireless Worldwide PLC intended to dispose of Hong Kong Telecommunications Limited to Singapore Telecommunications Limited. For fear of Hong Kong's telecom market falling into the grip of foreign enterprise, Linus helped Pacific Century CyberWorks, which was owned by Richard Li, buy out Hong Kong Telecom by borrowing loans amounting to 90 billion Hong Kong dollars.

=== PCCW ===
In August 2000, Pacific Century CyberWorks merged with Hong Kong Telecom into PCCW Limited, with employment contracts signed with a few senior management, of which Linus's term of deputy chairman of PCCW Limited was three years.

In February 2004, Linus resigned with service termination compensation amounting to $HK 45 million.

== Other positions ==
- Board of Directors, Sotheby's
