= Michael Kim (businessman) =

South Korean businessman (born 1963)

Michael B. Kim
- Born: Kim Byung Ju; October 1963 (age 63); Jinhae, South Gyeongsang Province, South Korea
- Other name: Michael ByungJu Kim
- Citizenship: United States
- Education: Haverford College; Harvard Business School (MBA)
- Occupations: Founder, MBK Partners, Philanthropist
- Spouse: Park Kyung-ah
- Children: 2

Korean name
- Hangul: 김병주
- Hanja: 金秉奏
- RR: Gim Byeongju
- MR: Kim Pyŏngju

Michael ByungJu Kim (Korean: 김병주, born 1963) is an American billionaire businessman of South Korean origin. He is the founder and chairman of MBK Partners, a North Asian private equity firm with offices in Seoul, Tokyo, Hong Kong, Shanghai, and Beijing. He has been called the "Godfather of Asian private equity".

He has been named one of Bloomberg's 50 most influential people in the world and Forbes Asia's Heroes of Philanthropy.

== Early life and education ==
Michael B. Kim was born in Jinhae, South Gyeongsang Province, South Korea in 1963. Kim graduated from Haverford College in 1985 with a BA in English Literature. He then went on to earn his MBA from Harvard Business School.

== Career ==
Kim began his career as a mergers and acquisitions banker at Goldman Sachs. In 1995, he joined Salomon Smith Barney, where he became a managing director and COO of Asia-Pacific Investment Banking. He later joined the Carlyle Group as president of Carlyle Asia until 2005.

Kim left Carlyle to found MBK Partners in 2005, which has since grown to over $30 billion in assets under management, raising $6.5 billion for its most recent Fund V, becoming the largest independent private equity firm in Asia. In 2015, Kim was named on Bloomberg Markets "The 50 Most Influential."

Kim chairs the Haverford College board of managers, as well as the MBK Scholarship Foundation. He also sits on the boards of the Metropolitan Museum of Art, New York Public Library, and Carnegie Hall.

Kim is the author of a novel, Offerings, published in 2020. In 2022, the novel was named a U.S. best-selling novel, and in October 2023, it was announced that it would be adapted into a film and produced by Anonymous Content and Anthology Studios. Under Kim's leadership, MBK Partners was named one of Time's World's Best Companies of 2024. That same year, Kim was voted "Most Influential in Korea’s Capital Market" by Market Insight.

In October 2025, Kim again faced allegations of tax evasion during an audit by the National Assembly's Strategy and Finance Committee. Lawmakers claimed that "Kim [had] earned significant profits domestically while paying little to no taxes", and called for a tax investigation; Kim and MBK Partners denied the allegations, saying it had fully complied with Korean laws.

== Philanthropy ==
In 2010, Kim pledged $7.5 million toward the construction of a new dormitory at Haverford College. The dorm was named "Kim Hall" in honor of his father, Kim Ki Yong.

In August 2021, Kim pledged KRW30 billion ($27 million) to the Seoul Metropolitan Government to build a public library in Seoul. Mayor Oh Se-hoon announced Seoul would honor the gift by naming the library after the donor, The Seoul Public Kim ByungJu Library. The gift was reported to represent the first-ever donation by an individual for the construction of a civic institution in Seoul.

In September 2022, Kim donated $10 million to the Metropolitan Museum of Art in New York. The museum stated it would name a gallery after Kim and his wife, the Michael B. Kim and Kyung Ah Park Gallery, the first gallery in the museum to be named after a person of Korean descent.

In April 2024, Kim donated $25 million to Haverford College (equal to the largest single gift the school had ever received) to establish an Institute for Ethical Inquiry and Leadership and to fund related faculty positions.

Kim was awarded "Philanthropist of the Year" by the Council of Korean Americans in 2017, and has been named one of Forbes' "Asia’s Heroes of Philanthropy" in 2021, 2022, and 2024.

== Personal life ==
Kim is married to Park Kyung-ah, the daughter of Park Tae-joon, the late South Korean Prime Minister and founder of South Korea's largest steel company, POSCO. The couple have two children and live in Seoul.
