= Reach Limited =

- Company type: Joint venture
- Industry: Telecommunications
- Founded: 2001
- Headquarters: Hong Kong SAR, China
- Area served: Worldwide
- Products: Submarine cable operator
Owner
| Telstra | (50%) |
| Hong Kong Telecom | (50%) |
- Number of employees: 300
- Subsidiaries: Reach Networks Hong Kong
- Website: www.reachnetworks.com.hk

Reach Limited is a Bermuda-incorporated holding company. It is a joint venture of Telstra and Hong Kong Telecom. Reach, headquartered in Hong Kong, has interests in more than 40 submarine cables (including AJC, APCN2, CUCN, Japan–US, RNAL, SEA-ME-WE 3) and international satellite systems, mainly servicing the Asia Pacific area. Reach has operating licenses and landing rights in most major markets including Hong Kong, Japan, Korea, Taiwan, Singapore, Australia, North America and Europe.

== History ==
Reach was established as a joint venture between Telstra and PCCW in 2001. Telstra and PCCW injected their international assets, including subsea cables, gateways and satellite capacity into Reach. These assets were supplemented later the same year by the acquisition of Level 3 Communications' Asian assets. After financial difficulties, its shareholders negotiated a debt settlement in June 2004, and it is now financially stable. Reach was restructured, and in 2005 announced that nearly all future expansion would be used for Telstra and PCCW requirements, though it would continue to service its other customers.

In 2011, PCCW transferred the 50% stake of Reach to its subsidiary Hong Kong Telecom (HKT).

In January 2011, Reach sold FLAG North Asia Loop System to PCCW Global (Singapore), a subsidiary of HKT.

== Network ==
The company operates 364,000 km (226,000 mi) of network cables connecting 240 countries and territories.

== Working with FBI ==
Telstra was compelled to strike a 2001 deal with the FBI and the US Department of Justice to give them surveillance access to the undersea cables owned by its subsidiary Reach, a new document released online and provided to Crikey reveals.
