= RNAL =

Reach North Asia Loop (RNAL) is a multi-terabit intra-Asia self-healing submarine telecommunications cable system, connecting the principal cities in Asia.

The 10,000 km cable network provides intra-regional, city-to-city connectivity between Hong Kong, Seoul, Tokyo, and Taipei. The cable network was developed jointly by Reach and FLAG Telecom. Reach has constructed the eastern leg of the multi-terabit cable that connects Japan, Taiwan, and Hong Kong, while FLAG built the western leg connecting Japan, Hong Kong, and Korea.

== Overview ==
FLAG manages and operates the system on its own behalf and that of Reach under a developmental agreement. FLAG and Reach each own three of the system's six fiber pairs. Reach markets its share of the system as Reach North Asia Loop (RNAL).

RNAL has the largest share of cable capacity in Asia with 29% (the second largest is C2C with 25%).

It has landing points in:

- Tong Fuk, Lantau Island, Hong Kong
- Pusan, South Korea
- Wada, Awa District, Chiba Prefecture, Japan
- Toucheng, Yilan County, Taiwan

== Technology ==
RNAL is a high-capacity 6-fiber-pair redundant loop system, upgradeable using Dense Wave Division Multiplexing (DWDM). Reach owns 3 fiber pairs and FLAG owns the other 3 fiber pairs.

Design of the Reach portion
System	Initial bandwidth	Maximum bandwidth
RNAL 1 (Hong Kong – Tokyo)	1 x 40 Gbit/s	3 x 640 Gbit/s
RNAL 2 (Hong Kong – Seoul – Tokyo)	1 x 80 Gbit/s	3 x 400 Gbit/s

== Service Availability and Configuration ==
The cable landing shore ends are buried through plough and jetting techniques to minimise the possible impact of fishing, large ship anchors and other ocean hazards that can occur in shallow water. Armored cable protection is also utilised in shallow water areas including the shore ends.

The RNAL is a self-healing loop cable with a traffic restoration time of less than 1 second in the event of a cable fault and availability of 99.999% (about 5 minutes of downtime per year).

Damage to RNAL was reported as affecting internet traffic to China on 18 August 2009.

== Upgrade ==
In January 2012 PCCW Global and Ciena Corporation jointly announced their intent to upgrade RNAL with Ciena's WaveLogic coherent optical 100G networking solutions. PCCW Global will light a ring of dark fibers on RNAL so that it can support significantly more than its original design capacity.
