= Sun Mobile =

SUN Mobile
- Formerly: New World Mobility Limited
- Company type: Joint venture
- Industry: Telecommunications
- Founded: 1997 (as brand); 1998 (as company)
- Headquarters: Hong Kong
- Services: Mobile network operator
- Owner: HKT (60%); Telecom Digital (40%)

Chinese name
- Traditional Chinese: 新移動通訊
Transcriptions

former Chinese name
- Traditional Chinese: 新世界傳動網
Transcriptions
- Website: www.sunmobile.com.hk

Sun Mobile Limited (branded as SUN Mobile), formerly known as New World Mobility Limited, is a mobile network operator brand and company in Hong Kong. It is a joint venture of HKT and Telecom Digital.

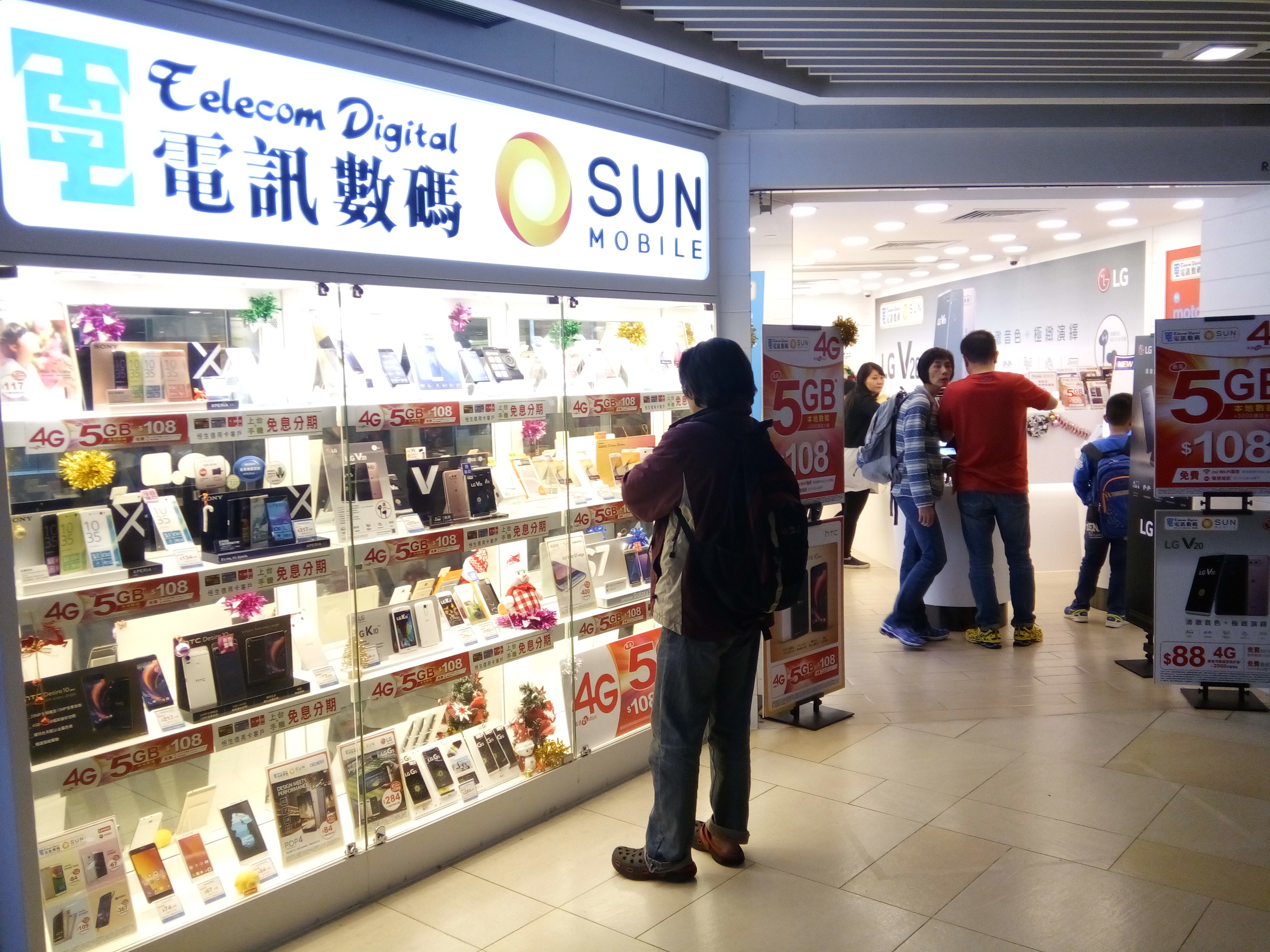
SUN Mobile store in Choi Yuen Estate.

New World Mobility Limited and New World Mobility was a subsidiary and a brand of New World PCS respectively; New World PCS itself was a subsidiary of New World Development. However, New World Development sold the shares of its successor CSL New World Mobility in 2013. The brand New World Mobility was active until 2014, which was changed to SUN Mobile in the same year; but the legal person New World Mobility Limited was once dormant until re-active again in 2008 as a joint venture of CSL New World Mobility and Telecom Digital. During the period of dormant, the brand was operated by sister company of New World Mobility Limited.

== History ==
=== New World Mobility ===
New World Mobility Limited was launched in 1998 and previously parented by New World PCS Limited, which the latter was incorporated in 1995. New World Mobility, as a brand, was launched in 1997. New World Mobility Limited later became dormant in 2003, which the brand was operated by New World PCS directly. New World PCS was also the licence holder of personal communication services since 1996.

New World PCS became a public company indirectly, via a backdoor listing. A listed company Asia Logistics Technologies acquired New World PCS Holdings (parent of New World PCS) from New World Development and renamed itself into New World Mobile Holdings in 2004.

In March 2006, New World PCS Limited merged with Hong Kong CSL Limited to form a new intermediate holding company called CSL New World Mobility, whose shareholders are Australian telecommunications company Telstra (76.4%) and New World Mobile Holdings (23.6%). New World Mobility became one of the brands of the holding company's mobile services. In October 2006, New World Mobile Holdings sold its 23.6% stakes of the intermediate holding company to New World Mobile Holdings' parent company New World Development.

New World PCS Limited was also renamed to CSL Limited, as a subsidiary of the new holding company in 2008. New World Mobility Limited was back from dormant also in 2008, which CSL Limited owned 60% stake since 2008–09 financial year. The rest of the stake of New World Mobility Limited, was acquired by Telecom Digital also in 2008; the latter was a mobile virtual network operator of brands such as "Rabbit", which bought the network usage from other companies. New World Mobility Limited operated the brand New World Mobility since circa 2008.

New World Development and Telstra sold the stake of CSL New World Mobility to HKT in December 2013. After the transaction, HKT owned New World Mobility, CSL, PCCW Mobile and other brands.

=== SUN Mobile ===
On 25 September 2014, New World Mobility Limited ceased to exist as HKT revamped the subsidiary under the name SUN Mobile Limited, the company was jointly owned by HKT (instead of CSL Limited) and Telecom Digital. However, the pronunciation of Sun was similar to the Cantonese pronunciation of the Chinese character 新 (Jyutping: san1) of the old brand; the new brand in Chinese, was also dropped the world "World" (Chinese: 世界) and replacing the suffix to "Mobile Communications" (Chinese: 移動通訊) only, instead of "Mobility Network" (Chinese: 傳動網).

== See also ==
- CSL Mobile, a mobile network operator that is also owned by HKT
- Sunday Communications, a defunct parent company of SUNDAY, a mobile network operator that was privatised by PCCW in 2005
- PCCW Mobile, formerly doing business as SUNDAY, a mobile network operator that was owned by PCCW and formerly Sunday Communications
