= Craig Ehrlich =

- Born: Los Angeles, California
- Education: University of California, Los Angeles, Occidental College Coro Fellowship in Public Affairs
- Occupation: Private investor
- Board member of: Chairman, Novare Technologies; Vice chairman, ISM; Lead independent director, Bharti Airtel; Board director and former chairman, GSM Association, Business chair, UCLA Anderson School of Management Center for Global Management
- Website: www.novare.com.hk

Craig Ehrlich is an American private investor and entrepreneur, the former head of the GSM Association, a trade organization which represents 800 mobile operators in 220 countries. Ehrlich played a central role in the development of the Asian cable and telecom industry.

== Early life and education ==
Ehrlich was born in Los Angeles, to Marvin Ehrlich, a garment manufacturer, and Norma Ehrlich, a politically active community leader. Growing up with Asian friends, he became interested in Asian culture and as a student at Hamilton High School in West Los Angeles, he participated in an experimental Asian studies program and studied Japanese.

In 1973, Ehrlich began attending college at UCLA. In addition to his coursework, he worked full-time for Los Angeles Mayor Tom Bradley, and served as student body president during his senior year. Ehrlich graduated with a BA in political science from UCLA in 1978, and went on to earn a master's degree in urban studies at Occidental College and a postgraduate fellowship in public affairs from the Coro Foundation.

== Career ==
In 1980, Ehrlich was hired at Falcon Communications as the assistant to Falcon's founder and chairman, Marc Nathanson. He worked closely with Nathanson to build Falcon, and gained experience in key areas of the company's operation. Falcon grew from 20,000 to 600,000 subscribers over Ehrlich's tenure at the company.

Ehrlich moved to Hong Kong in 1987, after he was recruited to head Hutchison Cablevision, a subsidiary of Li Ka-shing's Hutchison Whampoa conglomerate. Hired to run the company after an expected $550 million franchise license was granted, Ehrlich was initially responsible for putting together the project's bid. While the license fell through, Ehrlich's bid had included a proposal for a superstation to transmit all of Hutchison Cablevision's new programming via satellite throughout Asia. The idea gained the support of Richard Li, Li Ka-shing's son, and became the foundation for STAR TV, Asia's first satellite-delivered multi-channel television network. Ehrlich worked closely with Li as a founding member of the team that launched STAR, which was purchased by Rupert Murdoch for $871 million in 1993. Ehrlich moved from Hutchison Cable to the telecom arm of the Hutchison Group in 1991; as group operations director, he was responsible for the company's operations in 10 countries in Europe and Asia.

Ehrlich left the Hutchison Group in 1994 to become a private investor. Later that year, he started Cavite Cable, which became the first fiber optic cable company in the Philippines. Ehrlich sold the company in 1996, and shortly thereafter was recruited to develop and launch a new Hong Kong mobile phone service, SUNDAY. Described by The Economist as "one of Hong Kong's most innovative cellular providers", the company went public in 2000, and was listed on NASDAQ and the Hong Kong Stock Exchange. Ehrlich retired from SUNDAY in 2003, and returned to private investment and entrepreneurship. Focused on software, media, and telecom, he invested in and/or served on boards for companies in the Philippines, India, Taiwan, and China. In 2005, he founded Novare Technologies, an onshoring and outsourcing software development company based in Hong Kong and the Philippines.

From 2002, when there were less than 1,000,000 mobile subscribers, through 2008, when there more than 4 billion, Ehrlich served as the chairman of the GSM Association. He is credited with restructuring GSMA from a Euro-centric standards body to a powerful global trade association. In a 2008 interview, Ehrlich said: "I wanted to change it to a proper world-class trade association that focuses on commercialization and strategy, rather than some Athenian democracy getting into the nitty-gritty of the technology."

Ehrlich is the board chair of UCLA Anderson's Center for Global Management, and is a member of UCLA/Peking University's Board of Directors. Ehrlich served as the chairman of the UCLA Foundation beginning in July 2020. The foundation oversees the endowments of more than $3.8 billion.

== Philanthropy ==
Ehrlich created the Norma J. Ehrlich Scholarship in honor of his mother; as of 2000, the scholarship had provided support for 80 women. Awarded annually, the scholarship recognizes women who were educated in the public school system of California and have been actively involved in their communities. Additionally, he established the Craig Ehrlich Fellowship at the UCLA Anderson School for Management, which is awarded annually to two MBA candidates from mainland China, Hong Kong, or Taiwan. The scholarships are granted to students who are likely to utilize their UCLA education as well as their experience of American culture in their country of origin. Since 2015, Ehrlich has been on the Executive Committee of the UCLA Foundation.

== Personal ==
Ehrlich has lived in Hong Kong since 1987. He has a daughter, Leah, who was born in 2005.

Ehrlich and also maintain homes in Manila and Santa Monica, California. The Santa Monica house, built in 2005, is noted for its sustainability.

== Advisory boards and affiliations ==
Organization	Title	Date
Novare Technologies; Hong Kong and Philippines	Chairman	2005–present
Bharti Airtel Limited; New Delhi, India	Board of director	2009–2021
GTI; Beijing	Chairman	2010–present
GSMA; London	Board of director	2002–2012
ISM; Manila, Philippines	Vice chairman	2002–2018
UCLA Anderson School of Management; Center for Global Management; UCLA Anderson School of Management; Los Angeles	Board chair Board member	2010–2020; 2021-present
ValuAccess Asia Limited; Hong Kong	Board of director	2013–2016
UCLA/Peking University; Beijing	Board of director	2010–2020
Carmel Ventures Asia; Hong Kong	Chairman	2009-2013
ITU Telecom; Geneva, Switzerland	Board of director	2009-2012
PhilWeb Corporation; Manila, Philippines	Chairman	2003-2013
kbro Taiwan	Chairman	2003-2008
ECI Telecom; Tel Aviv	Board of director	2003-2008
GSMA; London	Chairman	2002-2008
Roamware; San Jose, CA	Board of director	2001-2008
UCLA Foundation; Los Angeles	Executive committee	2015–present
UCLA Foundation; Los Angeles	Chairman	2020–present
Lumos Global; Tel Aviv	Board of director	2017–2021
