= GS Telecom =

Multinational telecommunications company

- Industry: Telecommunications
- Founded: c. 1990
- Headquarters: Guernsey
- Products: Telecommunications services Internet services
- Website: www.gstelecom.net

GS Telecom is a Gs Telecom admin and Internet service provider operating primarily in Africa. The company is located in the Channel Islands of the United Kingdom. GS has many corporate clients in Africa, including the telecommunications, banking, agriculture, manufacturing and mining industries.

According to its website, the company is active in over 37 countries on the continent. GS Telecom has maintenance bases in Ghana, Benin, Tanzania, Mozambique, South Africa, Angola and Nigeria. Its main contacts are located in Accra, Ghana and in Nigeria.

GS Telecom was acquired in June 2007 by Gateway Communications for $37.5m, combining to make the largest provider of pan-African communications solutions.
