= Sunday Communications =

- Company type: Public
- Traded as: SEHK: 866; Nasdaq: SDAY (ADR)
- Industry: Mobile communication
- Founded: 24 November 1999
- Defunct: 2007
- Fate: acquired by PCCW in 2005; dissolved in 2007 after its business was transferred to PCCW
- Successor: PCCW Mobile
Headquarters
Grand Cayman, Cayman Islands	(legal)
Hong Kong	(de facto)
- Area served: Hong Kong
- Key people: Alexander Anthony Arena (Chairman)
- Services: mobile network operator
- Revenue: HK$1,159 million (2005)
- Net income: ▼HK$−156 million (2005)
- Total assets: ▲HK$2,685 million (2005)
- Total equity: ▼HK$513 million (2005)
Owner
PCCW	(79.35%)
Huawei	(9.91%)
- Number of employees: ▲908 (Dec. 2005)
- Parent: PCCW Mobile Holding No.2 Limited
- Subsidiaries: Mandarin Communications (trading as SUNDAY)
- Website: www.sunday.com
- Footnotes / references based on last annual report in 2005

Sunday Communications Limited (branded as SUNDAY Communications) is a Cayman Islands incorporated holding company, but headquartered and listed in Hong Kong. It is the parent company of a mobile network operator of Hong Kong, Mandarin Communications (do business as SUNDAY).

== History ==
Sunday Communications Limited, was registered in Hong Kong as a foreign company in 2000; it was a listed company on the Stock Exchange of Hong Kong since March 2000. The group, via a subsidiary, Hong Kong incorporated Mandarin Communications (trading as SUNDAY), was a mobile network operator of Hong Kong; Mandarin Communications itself, was incorporated in 1994 and launched operations in 1997. It provided 2G GSM, 3G, fixed line, and IDD services.

The majority stake of Sunday Communications was acquired by PCCW, via a SPV, PCCW Mobile Holding No.2 Limited in 2005, from Distacom Communications, USI Holdings and other minority shareholders, Sunday Communications sold Mandarin Communications and other businesses to PCCW as an intra-group transaction for HK$1.9435 billion and was delisted in 2006. Mandarin Communications, was then renamed to PCCW Mobile HK in 2007; Sunday Communications, as a subsidiary of PCCW, was dissolved in 2007. Sunday stores were also converted into PCCW exclusive stores on the same day, providing customers with bill payment, modification services, and other after-sales services, as well as mobile phone sales and installation, clean handset and accessory sales, and prepaid card sales.

== See also ==
- Sun Mobile, a mobile virtual network operator which was launched by HKT (a PCCW subsidiary) and Telecom Digital
- Craig Ehrlich, former Managing Director
