= City Telecom (Hong Kong) =

Hong Kong telecommunications group

City Telecom (H.K.) Limited
- Company type: Public
- Traded as: SEHK: 1137, Nasdaq: CTEL
- Industry: Telecommunications
- Founded: 1992
- Defunct: 2013
- Fate: Main business HKBN was sold; the parent company was renamed to HKTV
- Successor: Hong Kong Television Network (legal person); Hong Kong Broadband Network (main business)
- Headquarters: Hong Kong
- Key people: Chairman: Ricky Wong Wai Kay
- Number of employees: 3,000

Chinese name
- Traditional Chinese: 城市電訊(香港)
Transcriptions
Standard Mandarin
- Hanyu Pinyin: chéngshì diànxìn (Xiānggǎng)
Yue: Cantonese
- Jyutping: sing4 si5 din6 seon3 hoeng1 gong2
- Website: www.ctigroup.com.hk

City Telecom (H.K.) Limited (abb. CTI) was a Hong Kong telecommunications group that was established in 1992. It was a provider of fixed line, international direct dialing services, and later an internet service provider via a subsidiary and brand Hong Kong Broadband Network. After selling its main business, the parent company was renamed Hong Kong Television Network in order to attempt to enter the free-to-air television market of Hong Kong.

== History ==
CTI established a wholly owned subsidiary, Hong Kong Broadband Network (HKBN), in 1999 to provide fixed telecom network services. It provided residential broadband Internet access, telephony, IP-TV and corporate data services with their self-built Metro Ethernet IP network. Since their establishment, the Group has aggressively marketed itself and its services to capitalize on the growth and deregulation of the Hong Kong telecommunications market. HKBN was the first ISP to deploy Fibre-To-The-Home (FTTH) in the local residential market in September 2007 while the other competitors still predominantly use copper wires for their last mile.

City Telecom was listed on the Hong Kong Stock Exchange (Stock Code: 1137) in August 1997, with an ADR Listing on the Nasdaq National Market (Ticker Symbol: CTEL) in the US in November 1999. In addition to the operations in Hong Kong, the Group also had branch offices in Canada and Guangzhou, China.

In May 2012, CTI sold to CVC Capital Partners its telecommunication businesses, including its long-distance calling services in Hong Kong and Canada, as well as its internet services provided by HKBN. In 2013, the group subsequently renamed itself Hong Kong Television Network in an eventually failed bid to enter the free-to-air television industry.

== Former subsidiaries ==
- Hong Kong Broadband Network
