= WTT HK =

Fixed line telecommunication operator in Hong Kong

WTT HK Limited
- Type: Private
- Industry: Telecommunication
- Founded: 1995
- Defunct: 2019
- Fate: acquired by HKBN
- Successor: HKBN Enterprise Solutions HK Limited
- Headquarters: Kowloon Bay, Hong Kong
- Area served: Hong Kong
- Owner: TPG Capital; MBK Partners
- Subsidiaries: COL Limited; WTT eBusiness Limited
- Website: wtthk.com

WTT HK Limited (Chinese: 滙港電訊有限公司), was the second largest fixed-line telecommunication operator in Hong Kong. In 2018, it was acquired by competitor HKBN and renamed to HKBN Enterprise Solutions HK Limited.

A member of the business groups TPG Capital and MBK Partners, as well as formerly The Wharf (Holdings), WTT HK was formerly known as Wharf T&T Limited (Chinese: 九倉電訊有限公司), New T&T Limited (Chinese: 香港新電訊有限公司) and Wharf New T&T Limited (Chinese: 九倉新電訊有限公司).

== History ==
Former logo of the company (left) and the logo of a subsidiary (right)

Established in 1995 as New T&T Limited, it was one of the first telecommunication operators to be offered a fixed line license after the Hong Kong Government decided to open this market to competition; Cable & Wireless Hong Kong Telecom had heretofore enjoyed a monopoly. The next year New T&T Limited was offering IDD service and residential fixed-line services.

Making its first net profit in financial year 2001, it was soon after renamed Wharf New T&T Limited.

In 2003, the name had changed into Wharf T&T Limited.

By 2006, the company decided to differentiate its offerings by providing some services through a different unit; Wharf T&T would focus on business clients and subsidiary i-Cable Communications, residential ones.

In 2007, it founded Wharf T&T eBusiness Limited, a subsidiary that delivers broadband applications and web applications to SME customers.

In 2016, MBK Partners, North Asia’s buyout firm, and TPG, a global alternative asset firm, completed the acquisition of Wharf T&T Limited from The Wharf (Holdings) Limited on 9 November 2016.

In 2017, Wharf T&T Limited announced the Company name change to WTT HK Limited (“WTT”).

However, in 2018, it was announced that WTT HK would be merged with HKBN. The deal was approved by the regulators and completed in the same year. In September 2019, WTT HK Limited was renamed into HKBN Enterprise Solutions HK Limited, as part of HKBN's unit HKBN Enterprise Solutions.

== Subsidiaries ==
Subsidiaries include COL Limited, which provides IT services to businesses having more than "40 years experience in the IT sector"; and WTT eBusiness Limited (WeB), which was established in January 2007 and is an Internet service provider catering to SMEs.
