= Hong Kong Broadband Network =

Hong Kong internet service provider

HKBN Ltd.
- Native name: 香港寬頻有限公司
- Type: Public
- Traded as: SEHK: 1310
- ISIN: KYG451581055
- Industry: Telecommunications
- Founded: 23 August 1999
- Founder: Ricky Wong Wai-kay
- Headquarters: Hong Kong
- Key people: William Yeung (Executive Vice-chairman)
- Services: Internet; Communication; Telecom
- Revenue: HKD 3.95 billion (2017–18)
- Net income: HKD 0.4 billion (2017–18)
- Owner: CMHK
- Number of employees: about 3,000
- Subsidiaries: Hong Kong Broadband Network; HKBN Enterprise Solutions
- Website: www.hkbn.net

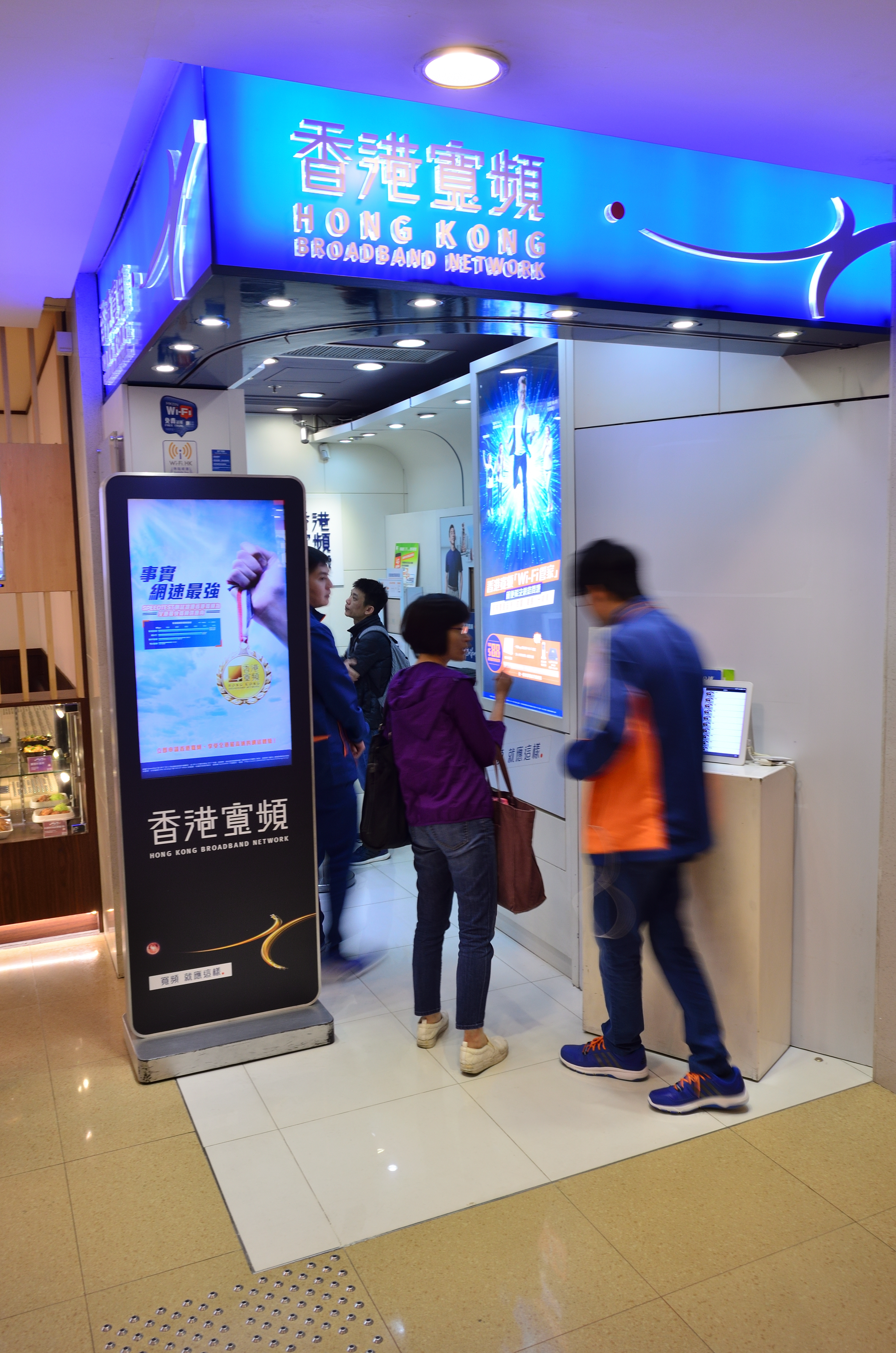
HKBN store in Wong Tai Sin, Hong Kong.

HKBN Ltd., commonly known for its subsidiary Hong Kong Broadband Network Limited (Chinese: 香港寬頻有限公司), is a Hong Kong–based Internet, communication and telecommunication company. Established on 23 August 1999, it is one of the largest residential and enterprise internet, communication and telecommunications service providers in Hong Kong.

Originally a subsidiary of City Telecom, it became an independent company in 2014. In February 2019, HKBN held a 35.8% market share of residential broadband subscriptions and a 19.4% share of the enterprise market in Hong Kong.

On September 17, 2025, China Mobile Hong Kong Company Limited (CMHK) completed the acquisition of 78.08% of HKBN Ltd. for HKD 5.4 billion.

== History ==
=== Founding and initial growth ===
Hong Kong Broadband Network Limited was founded on 23 August 1999 as a unit of City Telecom by Ricky Wong Wai-kay as the first operator to launch "triple-play" (Internet broadband, telephony, IP-TV services) on single network in Hong Kong, as well as the first service provider of residential broadband, with speed ranged from 100 Mbit/s to 1000 Mbit/s.

As of February 2019, HKBN has 864,000 residential broadband subscribers and 58,000 enterprise subscribers, made HKBN the second largest telecommunications operator in Hong Kong after HKT.

HKBN Group became a listed company on 12 March 2015 under a new Cayman Islands-incorporated holding company HKBN Ltd.; Hong Kong Broadband Network Limited was under listed company City Telecom (or known as CTI) until CTI sold Hong Kong Broadband Network Limited. In May 2012, private equity firm CVC Capital Partners, acquired the company for HK$4.9 billion. City Telecom (Hong Kong) was then renamed into Hong Kong Television Network. The current holding company of the group, HKBN Ltd., was incorporated on 26 November 2014.

=== Violation of the use on personal data ===
HKBN is the first company in Hong Kong to be convicted under section 35G of the Personal Data (Privacy) Ordinance by the Magistrates' Court since the law amendment in 2013, which states that it is a criminal offence to fail to comply with a requirement from a data subject to cease to use their personal data in direct marketing.

HKBN's conviction relates to a customer complaint in April 2013; the customer had made an opt-out request to HKBN via both email and post and HKBN subsequently acknowledged receipt of the request in writing. However, the customer still received a voice message through their mobile phone in May 2013, informing the complainant of the termination of their service contract as well as to promote other services of HKBN.

HKBN pleaded not guilty since the call was merely a service renewal "reminder", however Magistrate Debbie Ng Chung-yee ruled that HKBN used the contract's expiry as an excuse to pitch new services, as promotions of new contracts has not been included in the service scope agreed to by subscribers. HKBN was fined HK$30,000 in September 2015.

=== Expands to mobile broadband ===
In July 2016, HKBN has secured the Mobile Virtual Network Operator (MVNO) license from the Office of the Telecommunications Authority, as Hong Kong's 26th MVNO, to offer mobile services using its infrastructure of established mobile network operators. Partnering with SmarTone and China Mobile (Hong Kong), HKBN launched mobile services plans for personal and corporate consumers.

== Subsidiary ==
=== HKBN Enterprise Solutions ===
In 2016, HKBN acquired the telecommunications and online marketing business of New World Telecommunications (NWT) for HK$650 million; the merger was completed on 31 March. NWT was mainly active in the market of providing telephone phone to business customers; after the acquisition NWT was renamed to HKBN Enterprise Solutions. In 2019, HKBN acquired WTT Holding Corp. and renamed the company to HKBN Enterprise Solutions HK Limited.
