= CSL Mobile =

Hong Kong telecommunication company

CSL Mobile Limited 香港移動通訊有限公司
- Type: Subsidiary
- Industry: Mobile communication
- Founded: 1980 (first incorporation); 2014 (the merger with PCCW Mobile)
- Headquarters: Hong Kong
- Area served: Hong Kong
- Brands: csl; 1O1O; Club SIM
- Parent: HKT
- Website: hkcsl.com/en 1010.com.hk clubsim.com.hk/en/

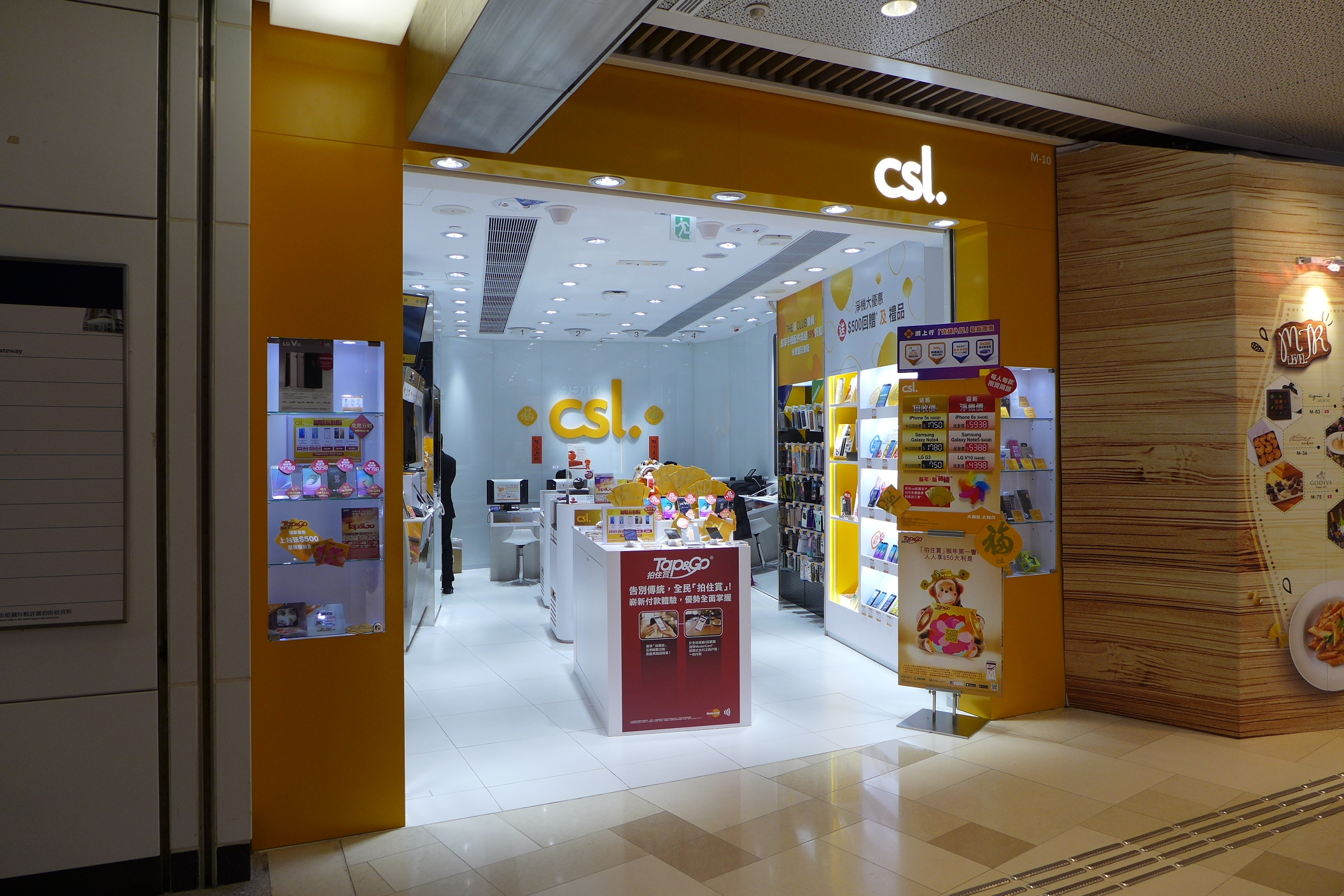
csl store in Tuen Mun.

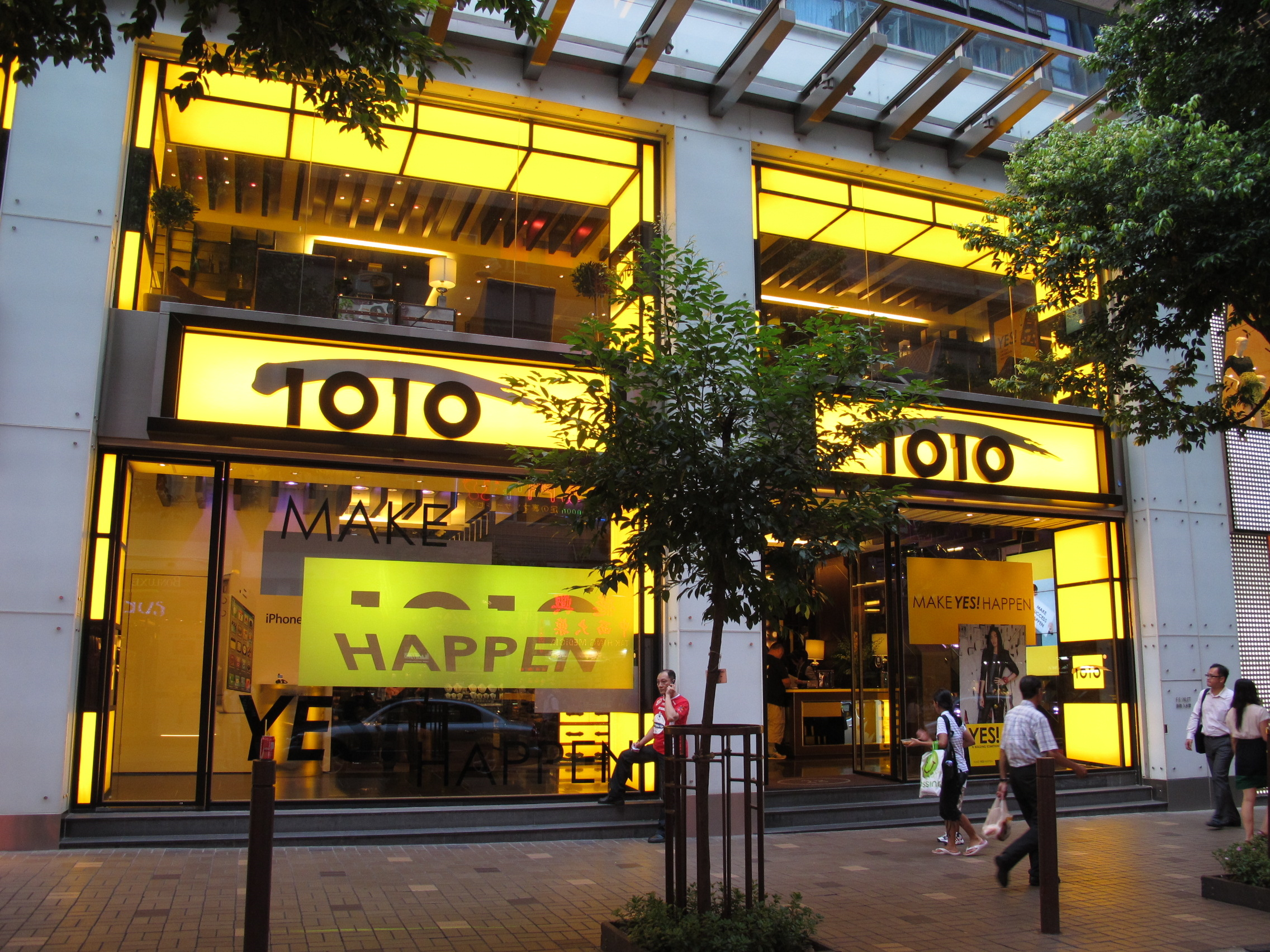
1O1O store in Tsim Sha Tsui.

CSL Mobile Limited (Chinese: 香港移動通訊有限公司; Cantonese Yale: Hēunggóng yìhduhng tūngseun yáuhhaahngūngsī) is a Hong Kong telecommunications company, which operates mobile network brands of "csl", "1O1O" and "Club SIM". CSL is a subsidiary of Hong Kong Telecom (HKT) and was Hong Kong's first mobile communications operator established in 1983, and also the first network to launch the world’s first dual band 4G LTE network with DC-HSPA+.

The brand CSL was under different legal person in its operating history, namely Communication Services Limited, which known as Hong Kong Telecom CSL Limited from 1990 to 1999, and then Cable & Wireless HKT CSL Limited from 1999 to 2001, and then Hong Kong CSL Limited from 2001 (it became a subsidiary of CSL Limited after the formation of CSL New World Mobility), CSL Limited (formerly known as New World PCS) and CSL Mobile Limited; The current legal person of the brand, CSL Mobile Limited, was formally known as PCCW Mobile HK Limited. It was the result of the merger of the brands CSL and PCCW Mobile.

== History ==
In the 1990s, CSL was a company of PCCW (formerly HKT). In 2002, PCCW sold CSL. In 2005, PCCW re-entered the mobile network operator business by acquiring SUNDAY and setting up a new brand "PCCW Mobile". In 2014, HKT (a member of PCCW Group) acquired CSL New World Mobility and its subsidiaries such as CSL Limited and New World Mobility. In 2014, the legal person of PCCW Mobile was renamed into CSL Mobile Limited. However, it used the brand CSL instead.

CSL was an abbreviation for Communication Services Limited and their original branding of "Create a Simple Life". The CSL brand, logo and corporate colour (green) were all updated in August 2011 and again in recent year.

=== Timeline ===
- 1980: Communication Services Limited was incorporated.
- 1984: CSL, a wholly owned subsidiary of Hong Kong Telecom, launches Hong Kong's first public mobile radiotelephone service using NEC's Advance Mobile Telephone System.
- July 1993: CSL launches its GSM service.
- June 1997: CSL launches its GSM 1800 network.
- December 1997: CSL acquires Pacific Link Communications. The acquisition included the digital cellular phone services (D-Amps), PCS (GSM1800) and radio paging services.
- 2000: PCCW Limited buys HKT, including subsidiary CSL (known as Hong Kong Telecom CSL Limited at that time), for an estimated US$38 billion from Cable & Wireless.
- February 2001: PCCW sells 60% of CSL to Telstra for $3.05 billion, in a joint venture called "Regional Wireless Company" (RWC).
- July 2002: Telstra purchases PCCW's 40% stake in RWC for A$1.1billion, giving Telstra 100% ownership of CSL.
- March 2006: CSL & New World PCS merge to become the CSL New World Mobility. The enlarged group owned the brands CSL, 1010, One2Free and New World Mobility, and was majority owned by Telstra; New World Mobile Holdings was a minor shareholder.
- January 2007: New World Mobile Holdings agrees to sell its quarter stake of CSL New World Mobility to its parent company New World Development, for US$321 million.
- March 2009: CSL launches the international award winning Next G™ network. Next G™ is an all-IP HSPA+ commercial mobile broadband network capable of download speeds up to 21 Mbit/s and provides the widest coverage in Hong Kong (as at 1 Dec 2011).
- November 2010: Launches the world's first LTE/DC-HSPA+ network in partnership with ZTE.
- June 2012: CSL and SK Telecom, the largest mobile operator in Korea, launches the world’s first 4G LTE international roaming between their two markets – Hong Kong and Korea.
- December 2013: CSL launches the first VoLTE (Voice over LTE) network in Hong Kong.
- December 2013: Telstra and New World Development have agreed to sell CSL New World Mobility to HKT, a listed unit of PCCW for $2.43B USD, essentially selling it back to PCCW. Telstra owns 76.4% of CSL, New World Development owns the rest 23.6%.
- May 2014: The Communications Authority agree to the sale of CSL, subject to conditions.
- September 2014: The brand New World Mobility was renamed to Sun Mobile, and owned by HKT and Telecom Digital
- December 2014: CSL launches the first LTE Advanced network in Hong Kong.
- April 2020: Become one of the three operators in Hong Kong to launch 5G network.

== Network ==
Frequencies used on csl (HKT) in Hong Kong
Frequency	Frequency Width	Protocol	Notes
900 MHz (895~905;940~950)	2*10 MHz	GSM/LTE	3G: 937.4;892.4
1800 MHz (1720~1740;1805~1825)	2*20 MHz	GSM/LTE	
2100 MHz	2*15 MHz	UMTS/LTE	3G: 2132.6;1942.6 + 2137.4;1947.4
2600 MHz (2530~2550;2650~2670)	2*20 MHz	LTE	swap spectrum with CMHK
2600 MHz (2515~2520;2635~2640)	2*5 MHz	LTE	via Genius Brand Limited (JV of HKT， three hk)
3.3 GHz (3330~3360)	30 MHz		
3.5 GHz (3460~3510)	50 MHz	5G NR	
4.9 GHz (4880-4920)	40 MHz		

== See also ==
- Sun Mobile, a mobile network operator that is also owned by HKT
