= Vision Values Holdings =

- Formerly: Wah Yik Holdings; Asia Logistics Technologies; New World Mobile Holdings
- Type: public
- Traded as: SEHK: 862
- Founded: 1998 in Cayman Islands and Hong Kong
Headquarters
Cayman Islands	(legal)
Hong Kong S.A.R., China	(de facto)
- Key people: Simon Lo (Chairman)

Chinese name
- Traditional Chinese: 遠見控股
Transcriptions

former Chinese name
- Traditional Chinese: 新世界移動控股
Transcriptions

former Chinese short name
- Traditional Chinese: 新移動
Transcriptions

Vision Values Holdings Limited is a Caymans-incorporated Hong Kong listed company. The company was under two backdoor listing, which the company was formerly known as New World Mobile Holdings (abb. NWM), Asia Logistics Technologies and Wah Yik Holdings before the takeovers. Under the ownership of New World Development, New World Mobile Holdings was the owner of New World PCS, a mobile network operator of Hong Kong.

== History ==
=== Asia Logistics Technologies ===
Asia Logistics Technologies (ALT) was a Hong Kong listed company. It was the majority owner of New World Cyberbase, for 27.48% stake as of 2004. Immediately before the backdoor listing of New World PCS, a unit of the conglomerate New World Development, New World Development already owned 5.60% shares of ALT, while Hong Kong businessman Simon Lo owned 30.11% as the largest shareholder.

=== New World Mobile Holdings ===
old logo

In 2004 Asia Logistics Technologies acquired New World PCS Holdings and its subsidiaries such as New World PCS (NWPCS) from New World Telephone Holdings, a wholly owned subsidiary of New World Development, as part of a backdoor listing. In the same year the company was renamed to New World Mobile Holdings.

In March 2006, NWPCS merged with Hong Kong CSL Limited to form CSL New World Mobility, a new intermediate holding company that was owned by Telstra (76.4%) and New World Mobile Holdings (23.6%) at that time. In October 2006, New World Mobile Holdings sold its 23.6% stakes of CSL New World Mobility to New World Mobile Holdings' parent company New World Development. In November 2006, New World Development then sold 58.04% shares of New World Mobile Holdings to Moral Glory International, a private company that was owned by Simon Lo at that time. In February 2007, Moral Glory International launched a mandatory public offer to acquire the remaining share of New World Mobile Holdings. In May 2007, Mongolia Energy Corporation (the successor of New World Cyberbase), disinvested 8.32% shares of New World Mobile Holdings to the public market.

=== Vision Values Holdings ===
New World Mobile Holdings was renamed to its current name, Vision Values Holdings in 2010.

It was proposed that Vision Values Holdings issues new shares to the People's Insurance Company of China (PICC). However, this was terminated by the PICC in 2016.
