= PCCW Mobile =

PCCW Mobile HK
- Trade name: SUNDAY (former trading name)
- Formerly: Mandarin Communications
- Company type: subsidiary
- Industry: Mobile communication
- Founded: 24 November 1994 in British Hong Kong
- Defunct: 2014
- Fate: merged with CSL Limited(Hong Kong)
- Successor: CSL Mobile
- Headquarters: Hong Kong, Hong Kong
- Area served: Hong Kong
- Owner: HKT (100%)
- Parent: HKT

former Chinese name (Mandarin Communications era)
- Traditional Chinese: 匯亞通訊
Transcriptions
- Website: www.pccwmobile.com

PCCW Mobile HK Limited previously known as Mandarin Communications Limited, was a subsidiary of PCCW (via HKT) involving mobile network operator of 2G and 3G in Hong Kong. It was previously owned by a Caymans-incorporated Hong Kong listed company Sunday Communications until 2006.

The company also owned the license of internet service provider and international direct dialing of Hong Kong.

== History ==
PCCW Mobile HK, previously known as "Mandarin Communications" (registered Chinese name 匯亞通訊有限公司; trading as SUNDAY), was a Hong Kong company that was incorporated in 1994. Mandarin Communications launched its 2G GSM 1800 network in 1997.

Mandarin Communications was a subsidiary of the listed company Sunday Communications since 2000. In 2004, the company signed a contract with Huawei, a Chinese telecommunications company, for the supply and installation of a 3G network to SUNDAY, as well as purchasing the shares of its parent company Sunday Communications. The group acquired the 3G license of Hong Kong via Sunday 3G (Hong Kong) Limited (stylized as SUNDAY 3G), a wholly owned subsidiary of Mandarin Communications.

However, the parent company, Sunday Communications, was acquired by PCCW in 2005, and the subsidiary, Mandarin Communications, was renamed to "PCCW Mobile HK Limited" in 2007, after Sunday Communications selling Mandarin Communications and other businesses to its parent company in 2006. PCCW made this acquisition to return to mobile business after it sold Hong Kong CSL Limited to Australia's Telstra in 2001–02.

Nevertheless, after PCCW, via its subsidiary HKT, re-acquired CSL (known as a different legal person, CSL Limited, at that time) and its parent company CSL New World Mobility from Telstra and New World Development in December 2013, PCCW ceased to use the brand PCCW in its mobile network operator services, which the legal person of PCCW Mobile HK was renamed to CSL Mobile Limited instead, in 2014.
