= CMHK =

Telecommunications company in Hong Kong

China Mobile Hong Kong Company Limited
- Trade name: CMHK
- Native name: 中國移動香港有限公司
- Formerly: PEOPLES Telephone Company Limited
- Type: Private
- Industry: Mobile communication
- Founded: 28 June 1994; 32 years ago (as PEOPLES)
- Headquarters: Hong Kong
- Area served: Hong Kong
- Products: Mobile telephones; Internet services; Broadband
- Parent: China Mobile
- Website: www.hk.chinamobile.com/en/home

China Mobile Hong Kong Company Limited or CMHK (Chinese: 中國移動香港有限公司), is a wholly owned subsidiary of China Mobile. The company was incepted in January 1997 and was the first PCS operator to launch such services in Hong Kong. CMHK is currently the largest telecommunications operator in Hong Kong.

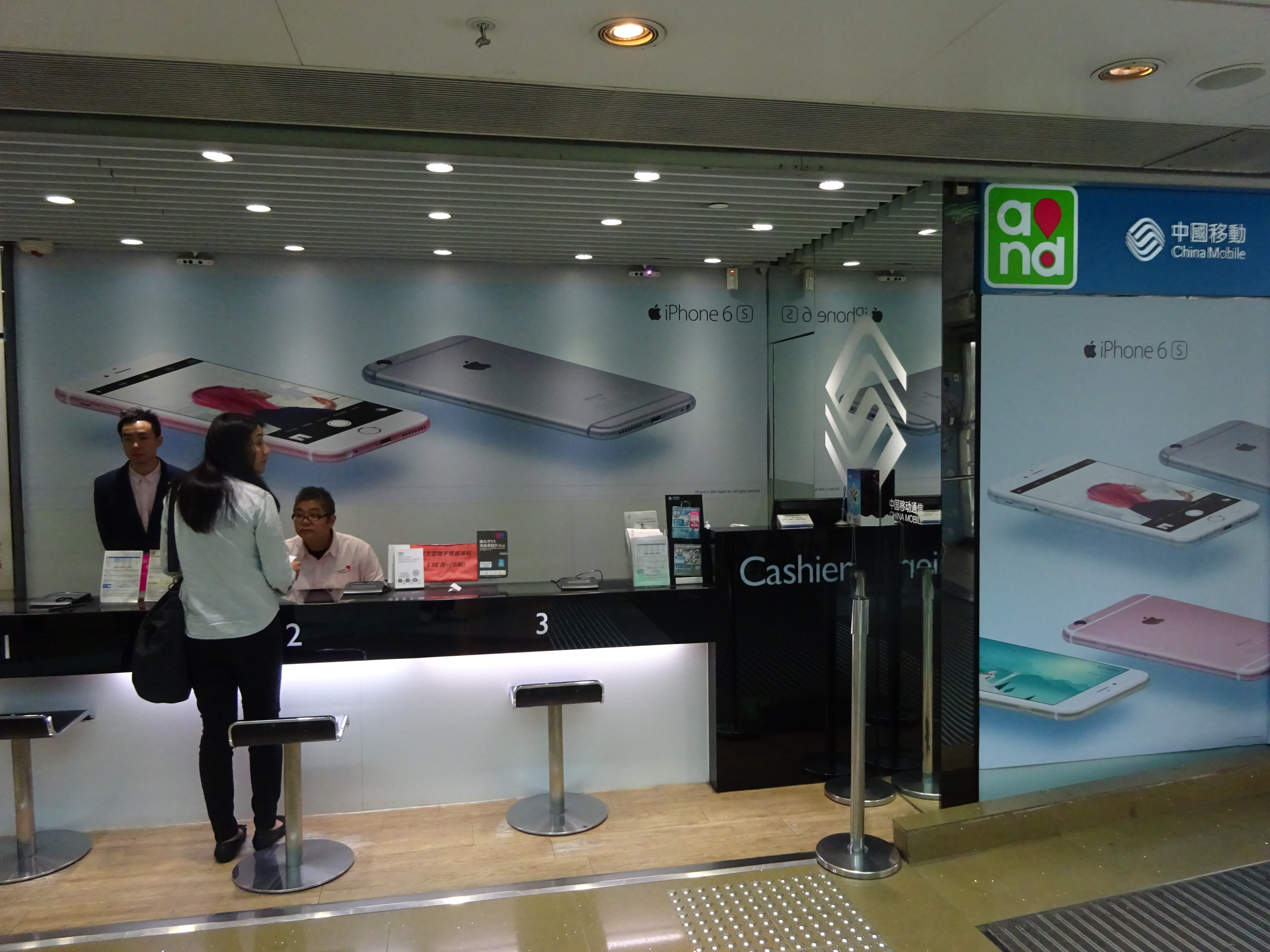
CMHK Store in Hong Kong.

== History ==
In June 1994, the company was first launched and established as PEOPLES Telephone Company Limited in Hong Kong and was awarded a PCS license in 1996 September. In May 2000, it was the first operator in Hong Kong to launch an open portal WAP service.

On 25 February 2004, it changed its name to China Resources Peoples Telephone Company Limited (華潤萬眾香港有限公司), named by its parent company at that time, China Resources.

In October 2005, it acquired China Mobile and changed its name to China Mobile Peoples Telephone Company Limited (中國移動萬眾電話有限公司) in April 2006. In March 2006, it was delisted and became a fully subsidiary of China Mobile.

In December 2008, it changed its name to China Mobile Hong Kong Company Limited but kept its brand name "Peoples".

In December 2012, China Mobile Hong Kong launched the world's first network TD-LTE/LTE FDD fusion (4G) for roaming.

In December 2013, CMHK launched its new corporate brand, plus its commercial brand "and!".

== Service ==
=== Mobile network ===
Frequencies used on CMHK in Hong Kong
| Frequency | Frequency Width | Protocol | Notes |
|---|---|---|---|
| 900 MHz (905~910;950~955) | 2*5 MHz | GSM/LTE | |
| 1800 MHz (1750~1760;1845~1855)+(1770~1780;1865~1875) | 2*20 MHz (not contiguous) | GSM/LTE | |
| 2100 MHz (1925.3–1935.2;2115.3–2125.2 ) | 2*10 MHz | LTE/3G | 2x5MHz 3G freq: 2127.6;1937.6 rent PCCW-HKT |
| 2300 MHz (2330~2360) | 30 MHz | TD-LTE | 20+10 Carrier aggregation |
| 2600 MHz (2670-2690;2550-2570) | 2x20MHz | LTE | swap spectrum with HKT |
| 3.5 GHz (3380-3460) | 80 MHz | 5G NR | |
| 4.9 GHz (4800-4880) | 80 MHz | | |

As of June 2017, CMHK has 8.274 million subscribers, making them the largest mobile network operator in Hong Kong. As of May 2018, CMHK provided network service 4.5G, 4G LTE (LTE FDD and TD-LTE), 3GHSPA, GPRS and EDGE.

As a subsidiary of China Mobile, CMHK has launched a series of cross-border mobile services for customers traveling between Hong Kong, Mainland China and around the world.

From June 2025, 3G network service of CMHK was ceased operation.

Effective from 12:00 am on 23 June 2026, CMHK was ceased 2G mobile network to focus resources on advancing leading network technologies such as 4G and 5G.

=== Home broadband ===
In 2017, CMHK launched their home broadband services with 3 plans of internet speed selection.
