= Hong Kong Telecom =

Telecommunications company

HKT Limited

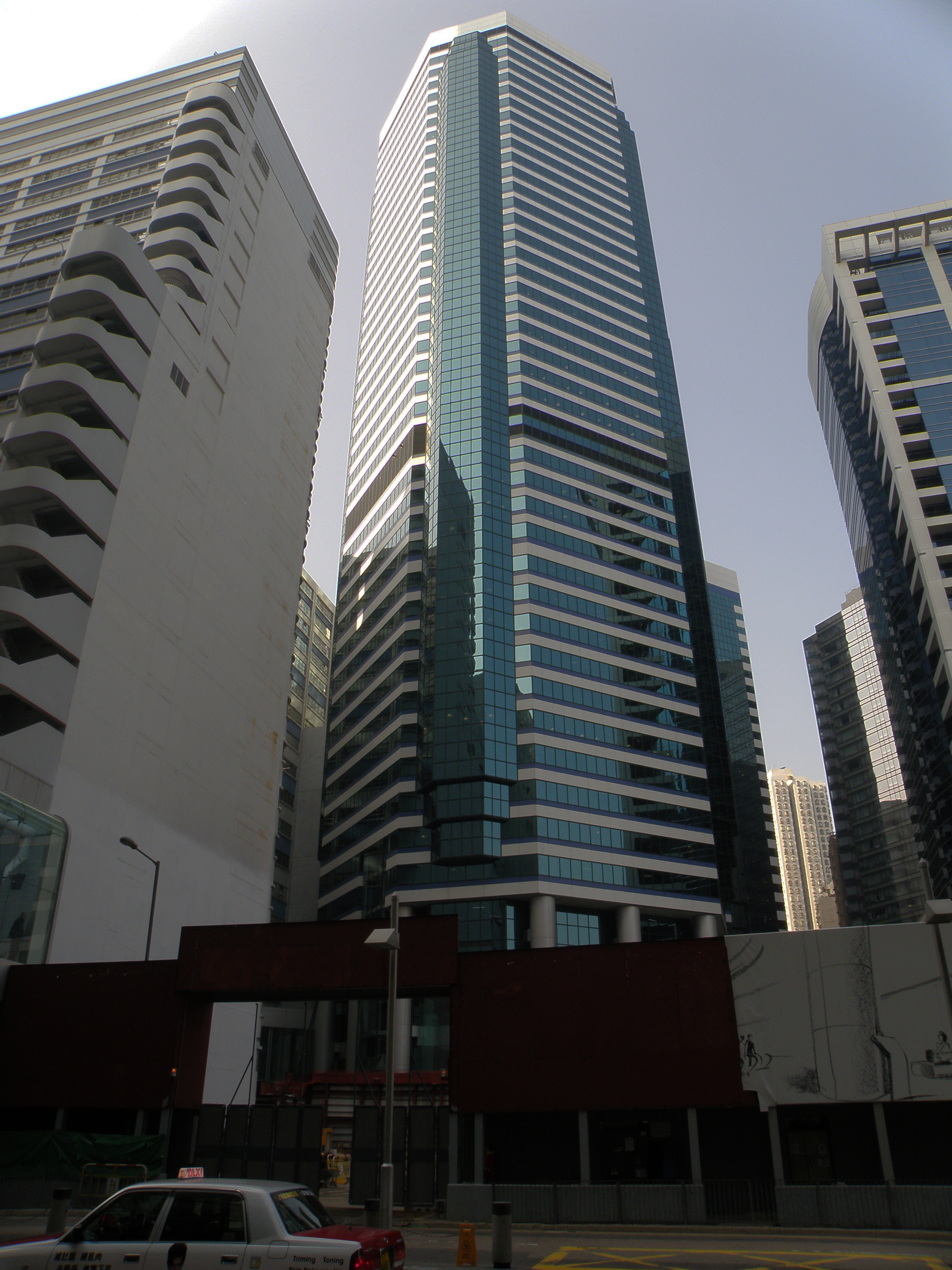
- Headquarters at PCCW Tower in Taikoo Place
- Formerly: Hong Kong Telecommunications; Cable & Wireless HKT; PCCW-HKT; Hong Kong Telecom
- Type: Public
- Traded as: SEHK: 6823
- Industry: Telecommunications
- Predecessor: Hongkong Telephone Company; Cable & Wireless (Hong Kong)
- Founded: 1872 (Listed on 29 November 2011)
- Headquarters: Hong Kong
- Key people: Richard Li
- Brands: 1O1O, csl, Club Sim, 1O1O HOME, Netvigator, HKT Home Phone, eye, Smart Charge, Smart Living, Now TV, Sooper Yoo, PCCW Global, The Club, Tap & Go, DrGo
- Services: Fixed-line, Broadband Internet access, IPTV, Mobile, IT Solutions, Data Centers, Contact Centers, Integrated Global Communications, Infrastructure, Advertising and Interactive Services
- Revenue: HK$34.75 billion (2024)
- Net income: HK$5.1 billion (2024)
- Total assets: HK$116.81 billion (2024)
- Total equity: HK$39.65 billion (2024)
- Number of employees: over 12,500 (mid-2025)
- Parent: PCCW
- Subsidiaries: CSL Mobile; Sun Mobile
- Website: hkt.com

HKT Limited (Chinese: 香港電訊有限公司; Cantonese Yale: Hēunggóng dihnseun yáuhhaahngūngsī), also used to be known as Hong Kong Telecom (香港電訊; Hēunggóng dihnseun), is one of the largest telecommunications companies in Hong Kong. It has a dominant position in fixed-line, mobile, IDD and broadband services in Hong Kong. HKT Group is a subsidiary of PCCW since 2000, after it was acquired from Cable & Wireless plc.

The company, along with HKT Trust (香港電訊信託), is a pair of listed corporations on the Hong Kong Stock Exchange, which the two corporations were bundled as one single stapled security.

== Corporate identities ==
The former holding company of the group was Cable & Wireless HKT Limited (香港電訊有限公司; former ticker symbol: 8). It was a subsidiary of Cable & Wireless plc. It was taken over and privatised by PCCW in 2000. PCCW also started to use the ticker symbol "8" after the takeover. Cable & Wireless HKT Limited was formerly known as Hong Kong Telecommunications Limited (香港電訊有限公司), which was incorporated in 1988; it was renamed to Cable & Wireless HKT Limited in 1999, but renamed again to PCCW-HKT Limited in 2000; PCCW-HKT still use the same registered Chinese name (香港電訊有限公司) until 2011, which in the same year the Chinese name became the registered Chinese name of HKT Limited instead.

PCCW-HKT had a major subsidiary PCCW-HKT Telephone Limited (香港電話有限公司), which was incorporated in 1925 under the name Hongkong Telephone Company, Limited; it was briefly known as Cable & Wireless HKT Telephone Limited (香港電話有限公司) from 1999 to 2000. As of 31 December 2017, PCCW-HKT as well as PCCW-HKT Telephone were still live, wholly owned subsidiaries of PCCW. However, the telephone services are now provided by HKT's wholly owned subsidiary, Hong Kong Telecommunications (HKT) Limited instead, after a group restructuring in 2008.

In October 2011, PCCW shareholders approved a partial spin-off of the assets as HKT on the Hong Kong stock exchange (but excluding the two legal persons PCCW-HKT and PCCW-HKT Telephone). HKT was successfully listed on 29 November 2011, as HKT Trust and HKT Limited. HKT Limited was incorporated in the Cayman Islands, while its direct parent entity, HKT Trust, was set up in Hong Kong under the laws of Hong Kong.

== History ==
Domestic telecommunications facilities in Hong Kong became more advanced in 1925 when the Hong Kong Telephone Company Limited (HKTC) took over the interests of John Pender's China and Japan Telephone and Electric Company. The company's mandate included providing all the British colonies with local telephone services. Over the next six decades, Hong Kong Telephone's line capacity grew to more than 2.5 million, with the company serving approximately six million people.

Telecommunications became increasingly important following World War I, and in 1929 the British companies Marconi Wireless and Eastern Telegraph joined to establish Cable & Wireless. The company's strategy was to supply telephone and telegraph services in Britain's colonies, and it succeeded in securing an exclusive franchise to provide international communications services in Hong Kong.

By 1972, the company's biggest operation was its subsidiary in rapidly growing Hong Kong. Hong Kong Telephone, meanwhile, built a new headquarters in 1972. The company's growth was said to typify the colony's transition from an economy based on manufacturing to one dependent on service industries, which created a demand for telecommunications services. In 1975 Hong Kong Telephone's franchise for domestic service in the colony was extended for an additional 20 years, to expire just ahead of Hong Kong's reversion to China's control in 1997.

=== Chronology ===
==== Hong Kong Telephone Company ====
- 1906: China and Japan Telephone and Electric Company acquired a 25-year franchised licence on fixed-line.
- 1925: China and Japan Telephone and Electric Company was acquired by Hong Kong Telephone Company Limited (HKTC). The government also granted HKTC a 50 years franchised licence on telephone service.
- 1968: HKTC's franchise was extended for another 20 years.
- 1983: HKTC started to build their own mobile radiotelephone service, which was supplied and installed by NEC; in the next year the service went public under HKTC's subsidiary Communication Services Limited

==== Cable and Wireless (Hong Kong) ====
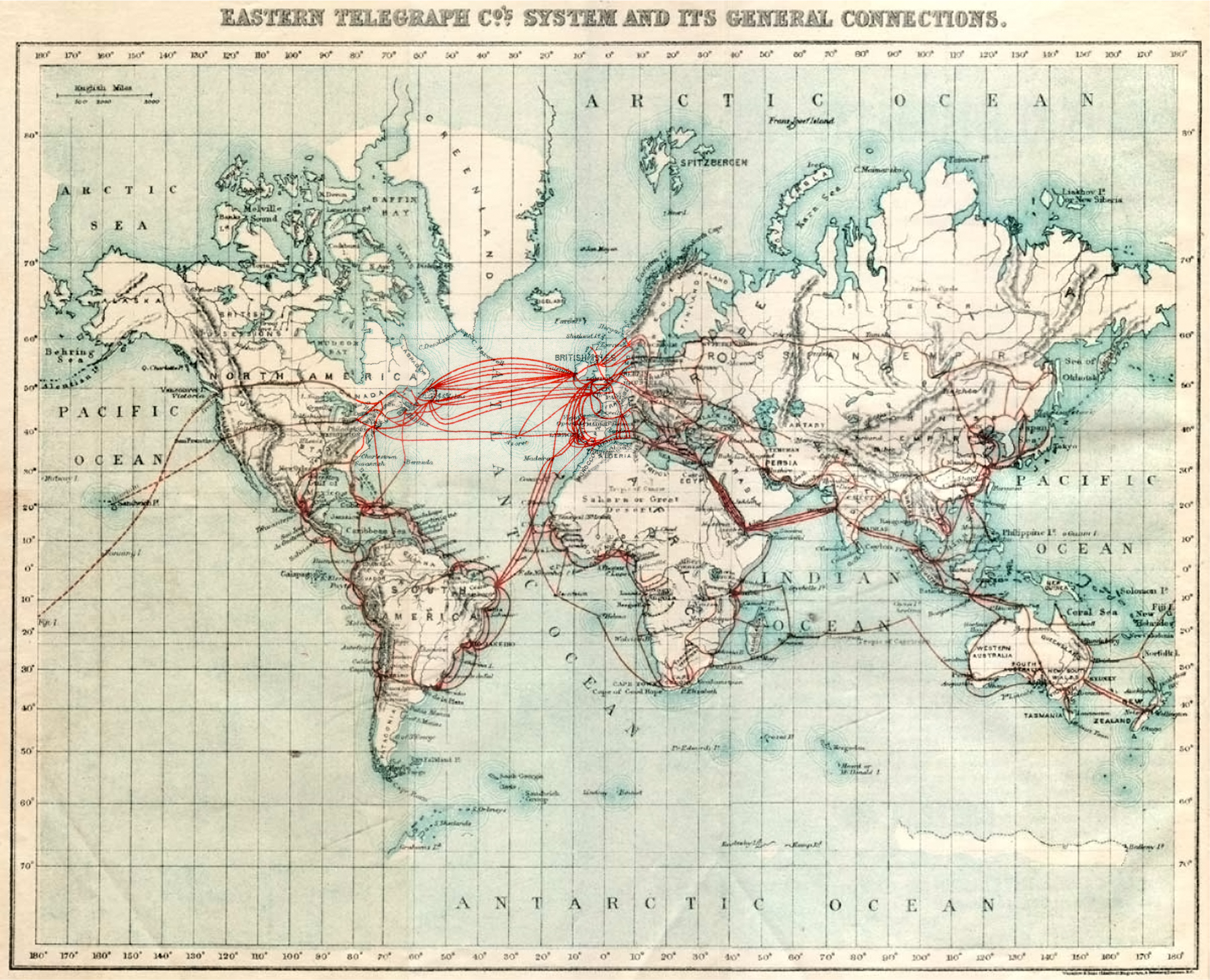
The Eastern Telegraph Company network in 1901, on the right was the Asia-Pacific network of the company

- 1871: The predecessor of Cable & Wireless established its Hong Kong branch, for its submarine communications cables that connect from Hong Kong to Saigon, Fuzhou, Manila, Labuan and Macau (or 1936 according to another source)
- 1962: Cable & Wireless acquired a 25-year franchise for telephone and telegraph services
- 1981: The Hong Kong branch of Cable & Wireless plc was incorporated as Cable and Wireless (Hong Kong) Limited (later known as Hong Kong Telecom International; HKTI). Hong Kong government was a minority shareholder for 20%.
- 1983: Cable and Wireless (Hong Kong) acquired 34.8% shares of HKTC from Jardine Matheson.
- 1986: Cable & Wireless also announced plans for an underwater optical fibre cable connecting Hong Kong with Japan and South Korea (a part of APCN), to become operational in 1990.

==== Hong Kong Telecommunications ====
- 1988: Cable & Wireless (Hong Kong) and Hong Kong Telephone Company merged to form a new telecommunications group, with the new holding company called Hong Kong Telecommunications Limited, replacing Hong Kong Telephone Company as a listed company on the stock exchange of Hong Kong and as one of the constituents of Hang Seng Index (the blue-chip index of HK). Government of Hong Kong owned around 5.5% shares of the new company immediately after the merger; Cable & Wireless plc remained as the largest shareholder.
- 1990: Chinese government controlled CITIC Hong Kong acquired 20% shares of Hong Kong Telecommunications from former British state owned enterprise Cable & Wireless plc.
- 1995: HKT's franchise to provide local fixed-line telephone services expired. HKT was one of the 4 companies to receive the new licence in local fixed-line services
- 1999: Hong Kong Telecommunications Limited was renamed to Cable & Wireless HKT; the subsidiaries, HKTC was renamed to Cable & Wireless HKT Telephone Limited; HKTI was renamed to Cable & Wireless HKT International.
- 2000: Cable & Wireless HKT was acquired by PCCW. Cable & Wireless HKT was renamed to PCCW-HKT Limited; the subsidiary HKTC was renamed to PCCW-HKT Telephone Limited; while HKTI was renamed to PCCW-HKT International
- 2001: the subsidiary HKTI was renamed to Reach Networks Hong Kong, it became a wholly owned subsidiary of Reach Limited instead, a joint venture of PCCW and Telstra; 60% stake of CSL was also sold to Telstra
- 2002: the remaining stake of CSL, the only mobile network operator of the group, was sold to Telstra
- 2005: PCCW-HKT takeover Sunday Communications, relaunching its mobile network operator as PCCW Mobile
- 2007: PCCW-HKT Telephone acquired the licence of CDMA2000 mobile network operator, and launched the services in the next year.
- 2008 to 2011: Hong Kong Telecommunications (HKT) Limited was incorporated; Moody's ceased to assign credit rating to PCCW-HKT Telephone Limited and assign a new rating to HKT Limited instead; it was reported that PCCW-HKT Telephone would become dormant. In the same year, some of the subsidiaries of PCCW, were transferred to an intermediate holding company HKT Group Holdings Limited (HKTGH), for example PCCW Global, PCCW Mobile, PCCW Media, PCCW Solutions, and engineering division Cascade Limited. However, PCCW re-organised HKTGH again in the eve of the 2011 IPO of HKT Limited, which some non-telecommunications businesses were spin-off from HKTGH. PCCW Media and PCCW Solutions for example, were directly owned by PCCW again. Also, HKTGH became a subsidiary of HKT Limited.

==== HKT Limited ====
- 2011: PCCW made HKT Limited, c/o HKT Trust, a spin-off business that separate listing on the Hong Kong stock exchange.
- 2012: HKT's PCCW Global acquired Gateway Communications, a satellite services provider
- 2014: HKT re-acquired CSL (known as its holding company CSL New World Mobility) from Telstra and New World Development; CSL and PCCW Mobile merged, with CSL as the surviving brand; the brand New World Mobility of the former CSL New World Mobility Group was renamed to Sun Mobile
- 2017: HKT and subsidiary PCCW Global jointly-acquired Console Connect, a provider of global interconnection solution.
- 2025: In October 2025, the Federal Communications Commission moved to revoke HKT International's license to operate in the United States, citing national security concerns due to its affiliation with China Unicom.

== HKT (Hong Kong Telecom) ==
HKT Group Holdings Limited was formed in 2008 to hold the telecommunications services, media and IT businesses of the PCCW Group, a reorganization designed to improve the Group's operational efficiencies. HKT and its predecessor PCCW-HKT, was the first quadruple play provider in Hong Kong, offering media content and services for fixed-line, broadband Internet, TV and mobile. PCCW acquired HKT, at that time known as Cable & Wireless HKT, in February 2000 from Cable & Wireless.

=== Main business and subsidiaries ===
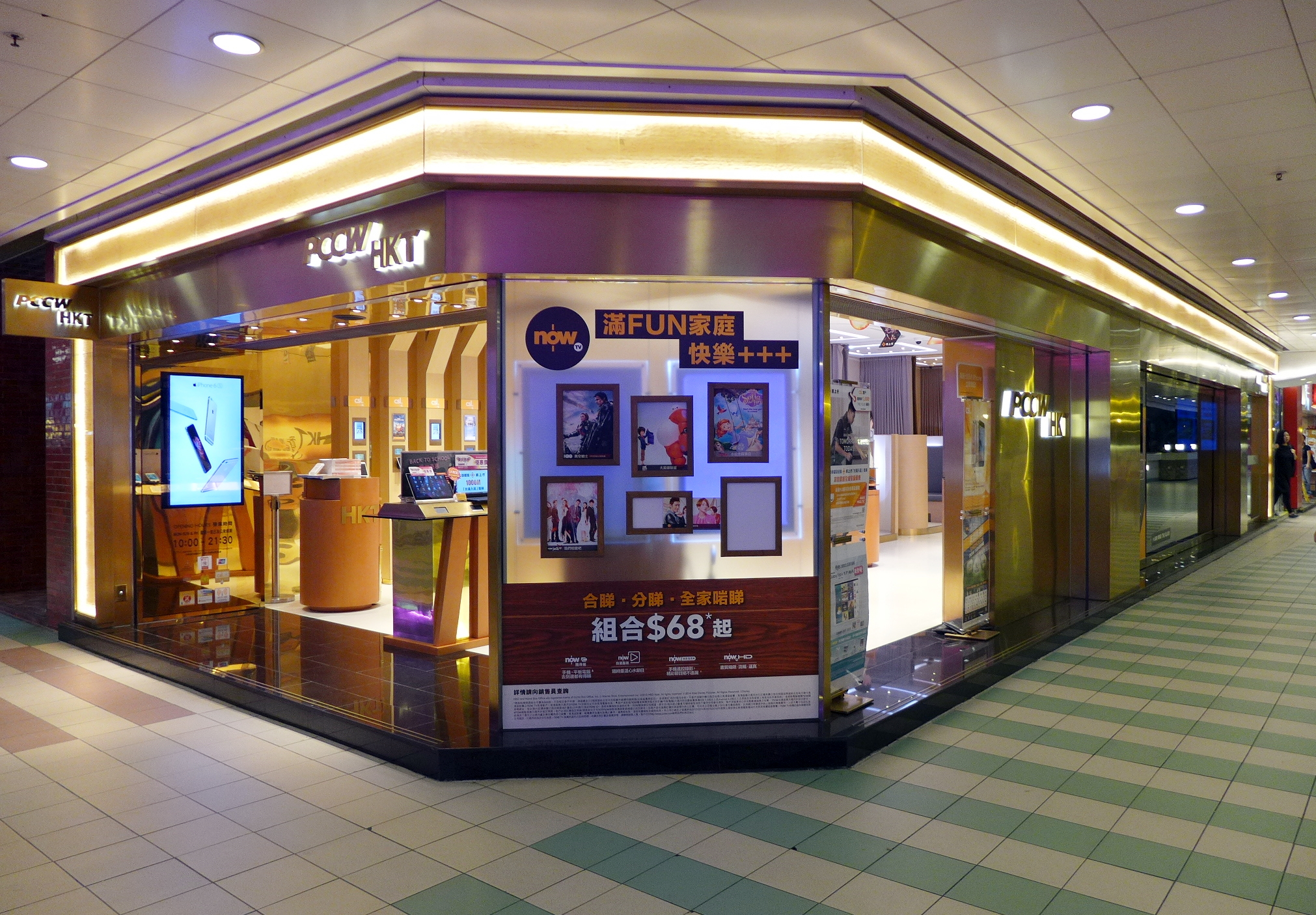
HKT Shop in Sha Tin, Hong Kong

==== Commercial and international business ====
The HKT Commercial Group provides ICT services to small, medium and large enterprises. The group managed the installation of Asia's largest IP-enabled network for securities and derivatives markets, built for Hong Kong Exchanges and Clearing Limited and known as SDNet. It includes an electronic passport system, known as e-PASS, and the first batch of Smart Identity Card for the Hong Kong SAR Government.

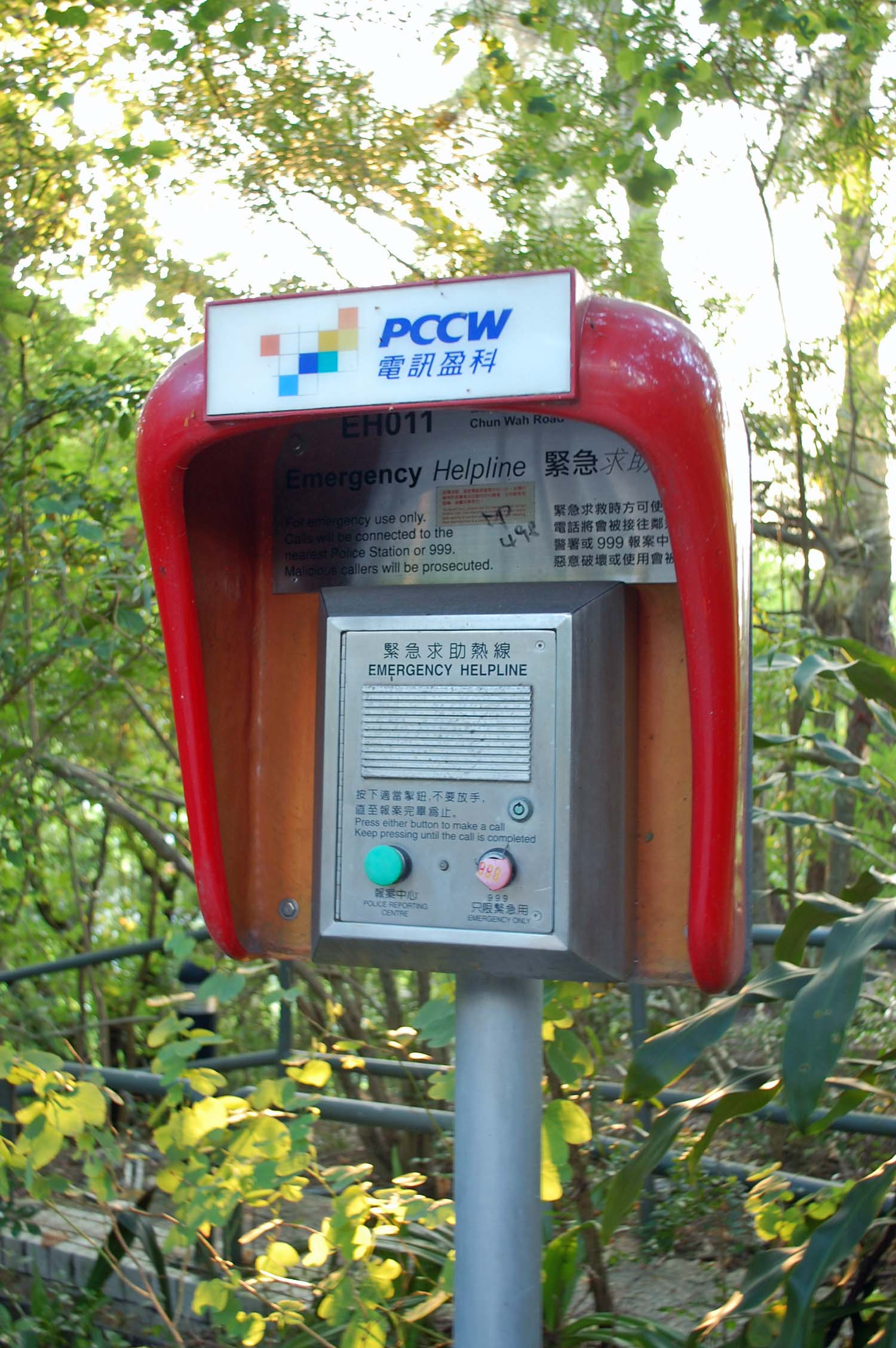
Emergency telephone along a mountain trail

HKT also provides cross-border network and digital technology services for enterprises operating across Hong Kong, mainland China and international markets. As of 2025, it has supported enterprises from Hong Kong and mainland China in expanding their operations overseas. Its network coverage extends to more than 40 major cities in mainland China and over 160 countries and territories worldwide.

In 2026, HKT announced the deployment of the ultra-low-latency 3.2Tbps AI Data Centre Interconnect (DCI) Superhighway, the first of its kind in Hong Kong. The network is designed to support innovation in Hong Kong, by providing high-capacity connectivity between major data centre clusters and support next-generation AI workloads requiring distributed computing and large-scale data transfer, strengthening Hong Kong’s position as one of the most advanced I&T hubs in the world. The first phase, connecting Lok Ma Chau Loop to Tseung Kwan O, is targeted for completion by the end of 2026 and will support the Sandy Ridge Data Facility Cluster upon commissioning.

==== Netvigator ====
Netvigator is a residential and commercial Internet service provider in Hong Kong, a brand of HKT Limited. It is Hong Kong's largest Internet service provider (ISP). Netvigator was awarded the Fastest, Best, and Most Consistent Fixed Network by Ookla in the first half of 2026. As of May 2026, HKT’s fixed broadband has met the ETSI F5G-A standard in 57,000 designated buildings.

==== csl, 1O1O, Club SIM ====
CSL Mobile is an HKT subsidiary, which operates mobile network brands of "csl", "1O1O" and "Club SIM" in Hong Kong. CSL, at that time incorporated as CSL New World Mobility, was re-acquired by PCCW via HKT in 2013. After the 2013 acquisition, HKT also merged PCCW Mobile HK into CSL. CSL was sold by PCCW in 2001, while PCCW Mobile HK, formerly SUNDAY, was acquired by PCCW in 2005–06.

In 2025, HKT announced the city’s first deployment of 25 Gbps mobile backhaul infrastructure at several major event venues, including Kai Tak Sports Park, the Hong Kong Coliseum, and the Hong Kong Velodrome. The upgrade is designed to strengthen 5G network performance and increase connectivity capacity during mega events, and to support Hong Kong’s growing mega event economy.

==== SUN Mobile ====
SUN Mobile, formerly New World Mobility, is a joint venture of HKT Limited and Telecom Digital. In 2013 CSL New World Mobility was acquired by PCCW via HKT Limited, from Telstra and New World Development, thus the mobile virtual network operator was re-branded as SUN Mobile.

==== HKT Teleservices ====
- HKT Teleservices, a subsidiary of HKT– offers global contact centre and business process outsourcing services in all facets of voice and non-voice customer services, technical support, sales, retention, and other business processes. It is headquartered in Hong Kong with major contact centres in Shanghai, Guangzhou, Beijing, Chongqing, and Manila.

==== PCCW Global ====
PCCW Global (formerly Beyond The Network America) is the international operating division of HKT Limited. It was owned by PCCW's sub-holding company HKT Group Holdings Limited (HKTGH) since 2008 and HKT Limited since its IPO in 2011.

PCCW Global acquired Gateway Communications in 2012, Crypteia Networks in 2014 and Console Connect in 2017.

In June 2025, PCCW Global, together with Sparkle, Telecom Egypt, and Zain Omantel International, signed a memorandum of understanding to develop the Asia–Africa–Europe-2 (AAE-2) subsea cable system. The project will link Hong Kong and Singapore with Italy through a combination of subsea cables and terrestrial routes traversing Thailand, the Arabian Peninsula, and Egypt, providing a new high-capacity connectivity pathway between Asia, Africa, and Europe.

===== YouTube incident =====
On 24 February 2008, Pakistan Telecom caused a major interruption of access to the video-sharing website YouTube. Pakistani Government authorities instructed Pakistan Telecom (PTCL) to prevent access to YouTube within Pakistan. PTCL complied by changing the BGP entry for YouTube – essentially updating its local internet address book for where YouTube's section of the internet is. The idea was to direct its internet users to a page that said YouTube was blocked. However, the ISP announced the new route to its Internet link provider, PCCW. PCCW had recently provided temporary access to PTCL in order to restore the nation's loss of internet access due to a previous major submarine cable break event. PTCL began leaking the BGP announcement to PCCW prior to PCCW's completion of the BGP validation and filtering policies process on the newly activated link. This allowed the announcement to propagate to other networks.

Once detected, PCCW immediately blocked the leaked announcement from PTCL and access to YouTube was restored within 2 hours.

=== HKT Interactive Media (PCCW Media) ===
==== now TV ====
now TV is an IPTV and pay-TV provider in Hong Kong delivered by PCCW Media. now TV serves Hong Kong with more than 190 channels of local, Asian and international programming, such as the English Premier League, Spanish La Liga, Italian Serie A, French Ligue 1, J-League, French Open, ATP World Tour, and World Snooker Tour. In addition, now TV is a producer of news, sports and infotainment programming and a provider of interactive services. nowTV can be viewed on its nowTV app, and select now TV content and interactive applications can also be accessed via the group's mobile network and broadband service.

=== The Club ===
Club HKT Limited integrated e-commerce and loyalty program offering rewards across travel, wellness, experiences, and shopping. Members earn Clubpoints from spending on The Club’s digital services, HKT affiliates, or partners, which can be redeemed for rewards or deduct spending on various services.

=== HKT Payment Limited ===
the developer of "Tap & Go", a prepaid mobile payment service for Hong Kong users.

HKT’s financial services arm, and the developer of Tap & Go, a digital wallet service for users in Hong Kong. In August 2026, Tap & Go launched Hong Kong’s first Single Use Card to provide enhanced security for online transactions and protect against fraud.

Brands and services

- HKT-eye over-the-top media services and Internet Protocol TV service delivered to firmware-modified tablet computer
- PPS (Payment by Phone Service) – a bill payment service provided by HKT and EPS.

== Former services ==
=== iTV ===
iTV, a video-on-demand multimedia interactive television service, was launched in March 1998. In addition to video, it offered music-on-demand and racing-on-demand. iTV was the first streaming platform in what later became the over-the-top television (OTT) industry. iTV ceased operations in September 2002.

=== Cascade ===
Cascade PCCW announced the formation of wholly owned subsidiary Cascade Limited (Chinese: 萃鋒有限公司) in late 2002. It was reported that the staff was offered a wage cut in the new contract. The Cascade name was removed and the division became a part of HKT, named "Engineering", a business unit of HKT similar to the Commercial group of PCCW. All staff in Cascade had transferred to HKT without changing; however, due to the 2011 initial public offering of HKT Limited, some subsidiaries of HKTGH (which HKTGH was a wholly owned subsidiary of HKT Limited) still use the name Cascade or PCCW due to legal and finance reasons, although they are wholly owned subsidiaries of HKT. A mainland China-incorporated "PCCW Cascade Technology (Guangzhou) Limited" (广州电讯盈科萃锋科技有限公司) namesake is a wholly owned subsidiary of HKT Limited.

== Controversy ==
In 2018, it was exposed that HKT breached the land leases for 4 of their telephone exchange buildings. They were illegally converted to customers service centres.

== See also ==
- Internet in Hong Kong
- Communications in Hong Kong
- List of telecommunications companies
- List of telecommunications regulatory bodies
