= Panama Canal ports dispute =

Ongoing dispute about operation and sale of ports

- Part of Post–Cold War era
- Date: January 20, 2025 – present
- Location: Port of Balboa and Port of Cristóbal, Panama
- Cause: U.S. pressure over alleged Chinese influence in the Panama Canal; Panamanian government audit of Panama Ports Company (PPC) concessions; Proposed $22.8 billion sale of CK Hutchison Holdings' global ports portfolio to a BlackRock–MSC consortium
- Participants: Panama; United States; China; Hong Kong; CK Hutchison Holdings (Panama Ports Company); BlackRock / TiL consortium; APM Terminals / MSC (interim operators)
- Outcome: Ongoing: Supreme Court of Justice of Panama annuls PPC's port concessions as unconstitutional (January 2026); Panamanian government seizes Balboa and Cristóbal terminals and issues 18-month interim operating contracts to APM Terminals and MSC (February 2026); CK Hutchison initiates $2+ billion in international arbitration claims against Panama; Comptroller General of Panama files criminal complaints over 2014–2023 concession irregularities (November 2026)

The Panama Canal ports dispute is an ongoing legal and geopolitical dispute concerning the operation and proposed sale of the ports of Balboa and Cristóbal which are located at opposite ends of the Panama Canal. The ports had been operated since 1997 through an indirect subsidiary of CK Hutchison Holdings under concessions granted by the Panama government. The ports are, however, separate from the canal itself, which is administered by Panama.

Following the inauguration of 47th US president Donald Trump, US officials including Trump accused China of exerting undue influence around the Canal and pressured Panama to take action accordingly. Panama subsequently began auditing the port concessions. On 4 March 2025, CK Hutchison Holdings announced plans to sell an 80% stake in its global port business (consisting of 43 ports in 23 countries, excluding port assets in Hong Kong and mainland China) to a consortium comprising BlackRock, Global Infrastructure Partners, and Terminal Investment Ltd (TiL), a subsidiary of Mediterranean Shipping Company (MSC), for approximately US$22.8 billion. US officials welcomed the prospective transfer, while Chinese authorities and pro-Beijing figures in Hong Kong criticised it. Amid regulatory scrutiny, the transaction was postponed.

On 29 January 2026, the Supreme Court of Justice of Panama ruled on social media that the port concession contract held by CK Hutchison Holdings was unconstitutional. The court stated in its ruling that the concession held by CK Hutchison's Panama Ports Company constituted disproportionate favoritism towards the latter and harmed Panama's national fiscal interests without just cause. José Raúl Mulino, the president of Panama, stated that the port would be temporarily managed by Maersk subsidiary APM Terminals Panama following the court ruling. CK Hutchinson rejected the ruling and initiated arbitration procedures; the Chinese and Hong Kong governments condemned the court decision, while the United States welcomed the court decision. As of August 2026, the dispute remains the subject of multiple international arbitration claims.

== Background ==
=== CK Hutchison's Panama Canal operations ===
Hutchison Ports Limited, a subsidiary of CK Hutchison Holdings, has been operating ports in Panama since 1997, managing the ports of Balboa (Pacific Ocean side) and Cristóbal (Atlantic Ocean side) through its subsidiary, Panama Ports Company. These ports are located at both ends of the Panama Canal and are of strategic importance to global trade. In 2024, Balboa handled approximately 2.63 million twenty-foot equivalent units (TEUs) while Cristóbal handled approximately 1.1 million TEUs. CK Hutchison was granted a 25-year franchise extension in 2021, until 2047.

=== Pressure from the United States ===
The second Trump administration had been dissatisfied with China's expanding influence in Latin America, especially the control of ports at both ends of the Panama Canal by Chinese companies. In his 2025 inauguration speech, Trump accused China of "operating the Panama Canal" and vowed to "[take] it back". US secretary of state Marco Rubio issued an ultimatum to the Panamanian government, demanding that China immediately reduce its influence in the canal or face "measures" that were not specified. US Secretary of Defense Pete Hegseth criticized China's influence in the Panama Canal region at a regional security conference and announced an agreement with Panama that would allow US warships priority and free passage through the canal.

Despite the Panamanian government's insistence that it has full control over the canal and that the operation of the port by CK Hutchison does not mean that China controls the canal, under this pressure, the Panamanian government began to reassess its relationship with China, including withdrawing from the Belt and Road Initiative.

In January 2025, before taking office, President Trump threatened not to rule out using force or economic coercion to reclaim the Panama Canal. The Panamanian government began auditing local subsidiaries of Hutchison Ports, raiding their offices and reviewing the 2021 Panama Canal port operation concession contract, which was criticized for its lack of transparency and limited benefits to the Panamanian economy. The Panamanian government claimed to have found several irregularities in the 25-year concession contract signed by the company in 1997, including failure to pay due amounts, accounting errors and failure to report company operations, resulting in a loss of approximately US$300 million for Panama. The Panamanian Comptroller General Anel "Bolo" Flores stated that the audit results would be submitted to the Panamanian Maritime Authority, which has the authority to terminate the contract with CK Hutchison. CK Hutchison denied the allegations made by the Panamanian authorities.

In February 2025, Secretary of State Marco Rubio visited Panama. He stated that China's influence on the canal was "unacceptable" and had violated the neutrality treaty of the Panama Canal. He demanded immediate changes, otherwise the United States would take action to defend its rights. In the same month, the Supreme Court of Justice of Panama filed a lawsuit to cancel Hutchison Ports’ port operation contract in the Panama Canal. In addition, the Panamanian Attorney General's Office has filed a lawsuit against relevant officials, accusing them of harming national interests when renewing the port concession agreement in 2021. The report indicated that Panama's actions were seen as an attempt to appease the United States and reduce China's influence in the region.

== Events ==
=== Sale of assets ===
Against the backdrop of increasing pressure from the US and Panama governments, CK Hutchison announced on 4 March 2025, that it had reached an "in principle" agreement with the "BlackRock-TiL Consortium", consisting of US investment firm BlackRock, Global Infrastructure Partners and Terminal Investment Ltd of the Mediterranean Shipping Company, to sell most of its global port business to the consortium for a total value of US$22.8 billion. The transaction is divided into two parts: CK Hutchison sells 80% of its stake in 43 ports in 23 countries around the world, totaling 199 berths, including all management resources, operations, container terminal systems, information technology and other systems. It also sells its 90% stake in the ports of Balboa and Cristóbal at both ends of the Panama Canal held by Panama Ports Corporation. However, the transaction does not include Hutchison Port Trust's operations in Hong Kong or any ports in mainland China.

According to the agreement, the Panama port transaction can only proceed after the Panamanian government confirms the proposed acquisition and sale terms. The completion of the overall transaction is also subject to conditions such as the BlackRock-TiL consortium conducting confirmatory due diligence, signing final documents, and obtaining necessary regulatory approvals. The transaction is expected to bring more than US$19 billion in cash income to CK Hutchison after adjusting for minority interests and repaying CK Hutchison loans. There are also reports that although the new buyer is the "BlackRock-TiL" consortium led by BlackRock, the assets will eventually be managed by the Italian MSC Mediterranean Shipping Company Group (TiL's parent company) after the transaction.

=== Share prices ===
Following the announcement of the deal, CK Hutchison's share price surged in the Hong Kong stock market. On 5 March 2025, the share price rose by more than 22%, reaching its highest level since August 2023. On 6 March, the share price rose further by 12.4%, reaching HK$52.95 per share, a new high since May 2023. However, after the Chinese government took a negative view of the deal, CK Hutchison's share price fell. On 14 March, the share price fell 6.7%, marking the largest single-day drop in about five years.

=== Pressure from China ===
Party and state leaders expressed clear concern about CK Hutchison's sale of the Panama port. On 17 February 2025, Chinese leader Xi Jinping attended a symposium on private enterprises in Beijing, releasing an atmosphere of support for the private economy. Some commentators pointed out that the authorities initially expressed principled support for the sale. However, the authorities later changed their attitude. The State Administration for Market Regulation stated that it would conduct an anti-monopoly review of the transaction, which could last up to 180 days, in order to ensure fair market competition and safeguard the public interest.

In addition, the pro-Beijing Hong Kong newspaper Ta Kung Pao published a commentary on 13 March 2025 entitled "Don’t be naive or confused", pointing out that netizens generally criticized Hutchison Ports for selling the Panama Canal-related assets, believing that "this is a spineless kneeling". The article was also reprinted on the website of the Hong Kong and Macao Affairs Office of the Central Committee of the Chinese Communist Party, showing the official strong dissatisfaction with the transaction. The share price of CK Hutchison fell sharply the day after the article was published. Ta Kung Pao subsequently published three commentaries criticizing the CK Hutchison Group's transaction for potentially harming national interests. On 15 March, Ta Kung Pao published a commentary entitled "Great entrepreneurs are all staunch patriots", emphasizing that "great entrepreneurs are never cold-blooded speculators, but rather passionate and proud patriots". However, some commentators have said that in addition to the very generous offer from BlackRock, it is also possible that the offer was made under pressure from the United States. On 17 March, Leung Chun-ying, vice chairman of the National Committee of the Chinese People's Political Consultative Conference, indirectly responded to the matter on his Facebook page, saying that "some Hong Kong businessmen mistakenly believe that businessmen have no motherland and think that everything is about business."

On 18 March 2025, Hong Kong chief executive John Lee Ka-chiu made a statement on the matter, saying that the public's concern about the incident deserves attention, and emphasized that the Hong Kong government opposes foreign governments exerting coercion or pressure on Hong Kong enterprises. Any transaction must comply with the requirements of laws and regulations, and the SAR government will handle it in accordance with the law and regulations. On the same day, Mao Ning, spokesperson for the Chinese Ministry of Foreign Affairs, responded to related questions at a regular press conference yesterday, saying that China has always firmly opposed the use of economic coercion and bullying to infringe upon and damage the legitimate rights and interests of other countries.

=== Transaction postponement ===
After a series of critical comments were published by pro-Beijing media, Reuters and Bloomberg News cited sources indicating that the State-owned Assets Supervision and Administration Commission of the State Council had instructed Chinese state-owned enterprises to suspend signing new contracts with companies under the Li Ka-shing family. On 23 March 2025, Richard Li, the second son of Li Ka-shing, the largest shareholder of CK Hutchison Holdings and chairman of the board of directors of Pacific Century Group, personally attended a forum held in Beijing by the Development Research Center of the State Council. He also took a group photo with Chinese premier Li Qiang. On 26 March, sources indicated that CK Hutchison Holdings continued to advance its plan to sell the port, and the relevant parties were finalizing due diligence, tax, accounting and other transaction terms, striving to sign the final agreement as scheduled before 2 April. On the same day, the website of the Hong Kong and Macao Affairs Office reprinted the Ta Kung Pao article "Business that disregards national interests will ultimately destroy its own foundation", criticizing CK Hutchison Holdings for "selling the port operation rights under the coercion of the United States" as "short-sighted behavior", "fueling the arrogance of hegemonism", and "having a certain negative impact on China's global port layout". On 28 March, according to Hong Kong media reports, CK Hutchison Holdings announced that it would not sign the agreement on the scheduled date, and that 2 April was not the "actual deadline" for signing the agreement, but in fact the earliest date on which the agreement could be signed. On the same day, the State Administration for Market Regulation stated that it would launch an anti-monopoly review of the transaction.

According to an announcement issued by CK Hutchison and BlackRock on 4 March 2025, the sale agreement scheduled to be signed on 2 April has been delayed. The South China Morning Post reported that this change does not mean that the deal has been cancelled, but rather that it has been temporarily postponed, and explained that 2 April is only the earliest possible date for signing the agreement, not the deadline. The Wall Street Journal and Bloomberg News subsequently reported that CK Hutchison still hoped to push the transaction to completion, but the actual buyer leading the acquisition was Mediterranean Shipping Company, controlled by the Italian Apont family, rather than BlackRock. It was reported that the buyer planned to separate the two ports located in the Panama Canal from the overall transaction, and initially only acquire the remaining 41 port facilities. On 27 April, the State Administration for Market Regulation made its second public statement on the transaction, emphasizing that the parties involved in the transaction must not circumvent China's anti-monopoly review in any form, and stated that no centralized transaction could be launched before approval was obtained, otherwise they would have to bear the relevant legal consequences. The following day, a spokesperson for the Chinese Ministry of Foreign Affairs also expressed concern about the progress of the transaction and called on the relevant parties to handle it prudently.

=== Legal actions ===
In July 2025, the Panamanian government filed two lawsuits against CK Hutchison Holdings’ local subsidiary. On 29 January 2026, the Supreme Court of Justice of Panama ruled on social media that the port concession contract held by CK Hutchison Holdings was unconstitutional. The court stated in its ruling that the concession held by CK Hutchison's Panama Ports Company constituted disproportionate favoritism towards the latter and harmed Panama's national fiscal interests without just cause. This ruling stemmed from a lawsuit filed by Panama's Comptroller General in 2025. After reviewing the contract, the Comptroller General claimed that the recent contract delays obtained by CK Hutchison had caused Panama to lose more than US$1 billion in tax revenue and recommended that the contract be rescinded. In response to the ruling of the Supreme Court of Justice of Panama, the board of directors of CK Hutchison Holdings expressed strong opposition, believing that the decision was inconsistent with the law that approved the concession agreement, and formally filed an international arbitration against the Panamanian government on 4 February 2026. CK Hutchison's subsidiary in Panama emphasized that the company has always fulfilled its contractual and legal obligations related to the port. On 10 February, CK Hutchison issued a notice to Maersk stating that if any third party takes over CK Hutchison's operations in the Panamanian port without CK Hutchison's consent, the company will take legal action. On 24 March, CK Hutchison's Panama Ports Company submitted supplementary materials to the International Court of Arbitration, expanding its claim against the Panamanian government to more than US$2 billion.

The Supreme Court of Justice of Panama stated that the ruling was made after extensive deliberation following allegations by the Panamanian government that there were irregularities in the audit. It also noted that specific legal details showed that the contract violated the country's constitution by involving privileges and tax breaks, and that proper technical approval procedures were not followed in the process of extending the concession. Alberto Aleman, special advisor to the president of Panama, issued a statement emphasizing that the legal proceedings reflected the normal functioning of the country's rule of law and institutional independence, and were not influenced by pressure from foreign governments. A subsidiary of CK Hutchison Holdings responsible for the port business in Panama issued a statement saying that it had not yet received notification of the ruling, but believed that the ruling violated the relevant legal framework and the laws that approved the contract, was contrary to good faith, and betrayed the spirit of the contract, which was regrettable. The Hong Kong SAR Government strongly opposed any foreign government using coercion, pressure or other unreasonable means in international economic and trade relations, which seriously damages the legitimate business rights and interests of Hong Kong enterprises in the local area. Chinese Foreign Ministry spokesperson Guo Jiakun responded to this matter, saying that China will take all necessary measures to resolutely safeguard the legitimate rights and interests of Chinese enterprises. José Raúl Mulino, the president of Panama, stated that the port would be temporarily managed by Maersk subsidiary APM Terminals Panama following the court ruling. On 3 February 2026, Panama Ports Corporation initiated arbitration proceedings against the Supreme Court of Justice of Panama's ruling on the port's operation rights in accordance with the applicable concession agreement and the International Chamber of Commerce Arbitration Rules, and demanded extensive damages and "permanently reserved all rights of action." Panama Ports Corporation also accused the Panamanian government of taking action to attempt to take over the company before the court ruling was officially announced, and emphasized that the company "is still striving to maintain the management of the port."

On 10 February 2026 Hong Kong Chief Executive John Lee Ka-chiu reiterated to reporters before attending the Executive Council meeting that the Hong Kong government was strongly dissatisfied with the ruling of the Supreme Court of Justice of Panama, believing that the ruling damaged investor confidence and urging the Panamanian government to respect the spirit of the contract. On 23 February, the Panamanian government began to forcibly take over the two ports operated by Cheung Kong Holdings at both ends of the Panama Canal and revoke their operating rights. On 26 February, Panama Ports Company was raided by Panamanian prosecutors. On 9 March, the Ministry of Transport of China held talks with relevant officials from Maersk Group and Mediterranean Shipping Company, which had taken over the port. According to sources cited by the Financial Times on 15 April, the National Development and Reform Commission, during talks with representatives of Maersk and Mediterranean Shipping Company, demanded that the companies immediately withdraw from port operations. On 10 March, COSCO Shipping announced the suspension of operations at the Port of Balboa. On 13 March, Panama Canal Affairs Minister Jose Ramón Icaza Clément stated that the Panamanian government hoped COSCO Shipping would reconsider its decision not to use the Port of Balboa. On 8 April, Panama Ports Corporation issued a statement saying that it had initiated arbitration proceedings against Maersk. On 20 August, CK Hutchison Holdings Limited announced that it had formally initiated international arbitration proceedings against Panama for violating the investment protection treaty, seeking more than US$1.5 billion in damages from Panama. In November 2026, Panama filed a criminal complaint regarding the prior port concession contract with CK Hutchinson.

== Reactions ==
- China: Foreign Ministry Spokesperson Guo Jiakun said that "China has always firmly opposed the use of economic coercion and bullying to infringe upon the legitimate rights and interests of other countries". In 2026, the Chinese government took a tough stance on the Supreme Court of Justice case. A spokesperson for the Ministry of Foreign Affairs said that all necessary measures will be taken to safeguard the legitimate rights and interests of Chinese enterprises and questioned whether some people are using the name of the rule of law to undermine international law. The Hong Kong and Macao Affairs Office issued a document criticizing the Panamanian court's judgment as "absurd" and "disregarding the facts," and warned that if Panama succumbs to the will of hegemony, it will pay a heavy price in terms of politics and economy.
  - Hong Kong: The Hong Kong Special Administrative Region Government issued a statement expressing strong dissatisfaction and firm opposition to the ruling. On 6 February 2026, Secretary for Commerce and Economic Development Edward Yau summoned the Panamanian Consul General in Hong Kong again to express his dissatisfaction and opposition to the ruling.
- Panama: President José Raúl Mulino refuted claims of judicial oppression, emphasizing that Panama is a country ruled by law, with a judicial system independent of the central government, and that the government must respect judicial decisions.
- United States: State Department spokesman Tammy Bruce welcomed the acquisition of control of the two Panamanian ports by American consortiums and said that China's dissatisfaction was "not surprising". In 2026, the US government welcomed the Supreme Court of Justice ruling, with Secretary of State Marco Rubio saying the US was "encouraged" by it. President Donald Trump saw it as progress toward regaining control of the Panama Canal and linked the ruling to his plans to push US companies to buy the port.
