= Now TV (Hong Kong) =

Pay-TV service in Hong Kong

- Founded: September 2003; 22 years ago
- Headquarters: Hong Kong
- Parent: Now TV Limited

Chinese name
Transcriptions
Standard Mandarin
- Hanyu Pinyin: Now Kuānpín Diànshì
- Wade–Giles: Now k'uanp'in tanshih
- Yale Romanization: Now Kwānpín Dànshr̀
- IPA: Now [kʰwánpʰǐn tjɛ̂nʂɨ̂]
Yue: Cantonese
- Yale Romanization: Now fūn pàhn dihn sih
- Jyutping: Now fun1 pan4 din6 si6
- IPA: Now [fʊ́n pʰɐ̏n tʰìn ɕì]
- Website: nowtv.now.com

Now TV (also stylised as now TV) is a pay-TV service provider in Hong Kong operated by Now TV Limited, a wholly owned subsidiary of PCCW. Launched on 26 September 2003, its TV signal is transmitted with IPTV technology through HKT's fixed broadband network.

Now TV is the largest pay-TV operator in Hong Kong in terms of number of subscribers, number of channels, number of HD channels and quantity of VOD contents. The word "Now" is abbreviated from "Network Of the World".

They provide 197 TV channels including 176 channels branded under Now TV, 32 of which are in HD. Additionally, there are 21 channels under the TVB Network Vision and over 30 video on demand categories.

== History and establishment ==
In March 1998, PCCW's services included a wide range of information and entertainment, such as news, video-on-demand (VOD), music videos, home-shopping, home-banking and educational content. iTV had some 67,000 subscribers at the end of 2000.

Due to the liberalization of the pay-TV market by the HKSAR government in early July 2000, the then existing duopolists, iTV and i-Cable, were confronted with ferocious competition. With fewer subscribers and hence the decline in the revenue generated from iTV, the interactive television operation was terminated in the final quarter of 2002. Now Broadband pay-TV service was launched in September 2003 with 23 channels under the same umbrella company PCCW; iTV is thus commonly viewed as the predecessor of Now TV.

In December 2005, Now TV introduced a technology with connection speed up to 18 megabits per second (Mbit/s). At least 75% of the service area will be offered a service running up to 8 Mbit/s. In addition, Video-On-Demand services were launched in January 2006.

Now TV subscribers have access to 136 channels.

== Business performance and development ==
Now TV service was launched with 23 channels in September 2003 but was soon expanded to exceed 30 with the addition of sports-related channels and BBC World and the Animax channel, as well as the Cantonese-language Star Chinese Movies and Xing Kong channels. Within four months of launch, Now TV had attracted more than 200,000 customers by end-2003.

According to a report in Ming Pao Finance on October 5, 2005, the number of subscribers to Now TV exceeded 450,000. Per annual reports issued by PCCW, at the end of December 2005 the number of paying subscribers to Now TV stood at 549,000 (approximately 61% were paid subscribers, with 31% being free subscribers). These figures compare with totals of 361,000 at end-December 2004 and 269,000 at end-June 2004. Despite the growth in subscribers, Now TV was operating at a loss in 2005. By August 2006, Now TV had in excess of 654,000 subscribers.

=== Strategy ===
In early July 2000, the HKSAR government awarded five new pay-TV licenses. The new entrants were all relatively seasoned broadcasting companies including Galaxy Satellite Broadcasting, Hong Kong DTV Company, a British broadcaster Elmsdsale, Hong Kong Network TV and Pacific Digital Media HK. The opening of the market sparked intense competition for programming and viewer share.

To avoid direct competition with the two local digital terrestrial channels – Television Broadcasts Limited (TVB) and PCCW subsidiary ViuTV – Now TV sought to build up and secure its local pay-TV position by signing long-term contracts with a variety of channels from around the world.

==== Exclusivity ====
On November 15, 2006, Now TV made a knock-out bid, of an estimated HK$1.56 billion, to secure the license to exclusively broadcast football matches of the Barclays Premier League matches in Hong Kong for three seasons commencing from the 2007–2008 season. Two years previously, i-Cable had paid an estimated HK$700 million for a three-year contract. Now TV announced in January 2006 that a three-year deal was signed with ESPN STAR for the rights to live matches of the UEFA Champions League during the 2006–2009 seasons.

In December 2006 secured the exclusive rights to broadcast the Euro 2008 football championship by agreeing to pay HK$400 million. Playboy TV has been exclusive to Now TV since December 1, 2006.

==== Pricing ====
i-Cable has been forced to adopt an alternative pricing model for its subscribers. It allows subscribers to pick and choose their own channels, similar to the pay-by-channel of Now. Moreover, from Asia Media in October 2005, Now TV claimed that they will not follow i-Cable to minimize monthly charges since they have added new channels and improved the delivery standard, in order to maintain competitiveness. In December 2006, it announced it was instead planning on raising subscription rates after having secured exclusive rights in the ESPN, Premier League, and Euro 2008.

=== Awards ===
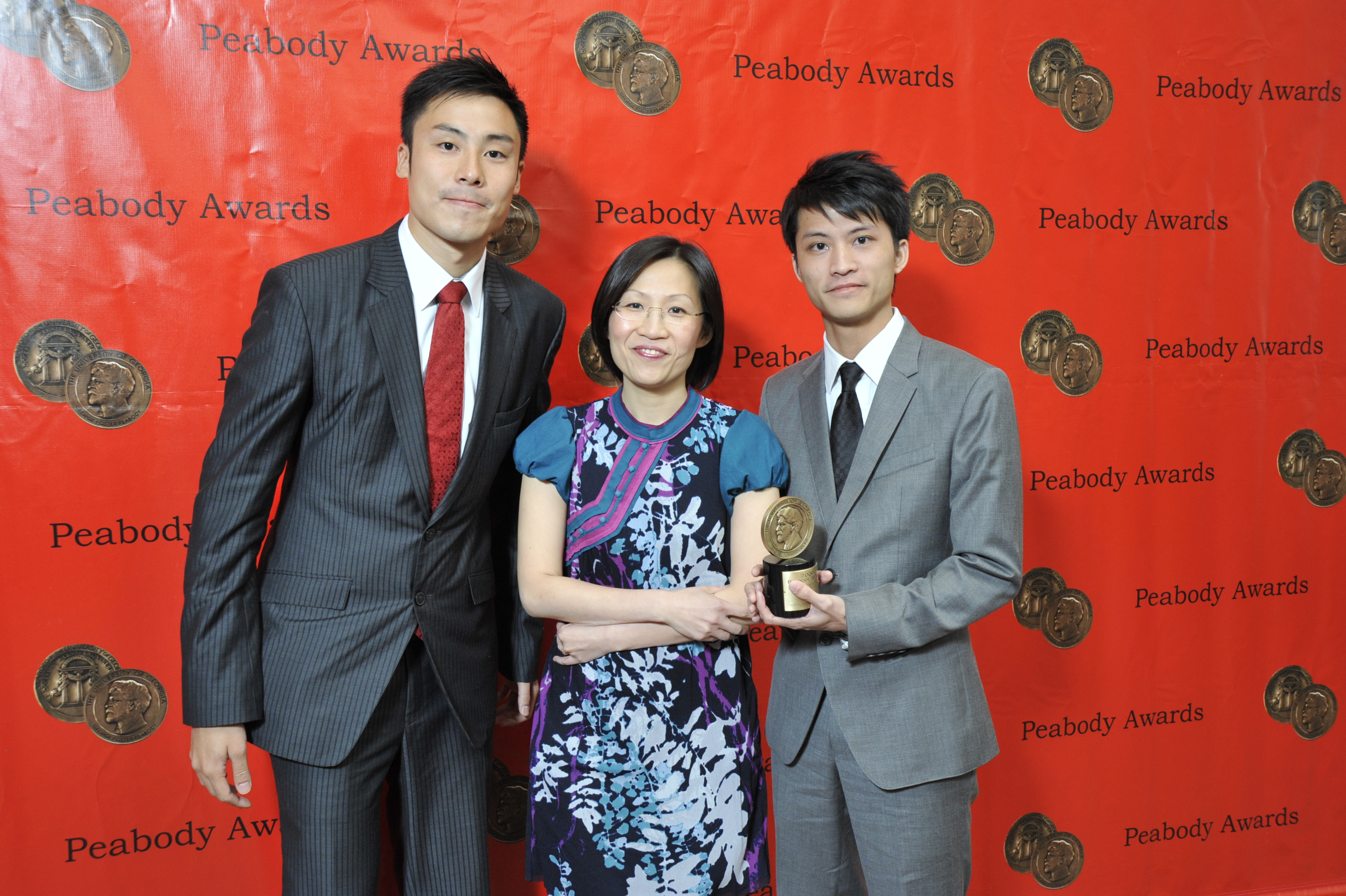
Annie Cheng and the crew of Sichuan Earthquake- One Year on at the 69th Annual Peabody Awards

At the 2004 Convention of CASBAA (Cable and Satellite Broadcasting Association of Asia), Now TV was awarded "The Chairman's Award". CASBAA, representing 120 corporations serving more than 3 billion viewers, acknowledged Now TV for its "innovative and proactive marketing of a secure and advanced pay-TV platform and for growing its interactive capability, resulting in a stellar subscriber take-up" on October 31, 2004.

== See also ==
- IPTV
- HK Television Entertainment
- Viu
- ViuTV
- ViuTVsix
