= Li Ka-shing family =

The Li Ka-shing Family refers to a wealthy family based in Hong Kong but with business interests worldwide. The family empire was started by Li Ka-shing, a wealthy Hong Kong entrepreneur who has long been Hong Kong's wealthiest individual and one of the wealthiest in the world. While Li Ka-shing and his family are best known for CK Hutchison Holdings and CK Asset Holdings, they are also associated with a number of other businesses outside of CK including (but not limited to) Pacific Century Group.

== Notable family members ==
- Li Ka-shing (b. 1928); entrepreneur, philanthropist, and founder of CK Hutchison Holdings and CK Asset Holdings, among others
  - Victor Li (b. 1964); chairman of CK Hutchison Holdings and CK Asset Holdings, among others
    - Michelle Li (b. 1996); director of the Li Ka Shing Foundation
  - Richard Li (b. 1966); entrepreneur and founder of Pacific Century Group

== Associated businesses ==
- CK Asset Holdings
  - Greene King
- CK Hutchison Holdings
  - A.S. Watson Group
  - CK Infrastructure Holdings
  - Husky Energy
  - Hutchison Port Holdings
- Horizons Ventures
- Pacific Century Group
  - FWD Group
  - PCCW
- TOM Group
