= Win Neuger =

Win Jay Neuger is the chairman and founder of EcoAlpha Asset Management, an investment management firm.

Prior to Eco Alpha, Neuger was the chief executive officer, chairman, and director at AIG Global Investment Corporation. In March 2010, AIG sold its Global Investment Corporation (renamed PineBridge Investments) to Bridge Partners, a subsidiary of Pacific Century Group. Neuger became CEO of Pinebridge Investments.

== Career ==
Neuger received an M.B.A. from Dartmouth’s Amos Tuck Graduate School of Business and an A.B. from Dartmouth College. He then went to work for Northwestern National Bank (now Wells Fargo) and eventually ran the fixed income business. In 1982, he left to become the chief investment officer at Western Asset Management (now Legg Mason). In 1984, he moved to Banker's Trust on a "rescue mission as BT was bleeding assets as a result of poor performance." Neuger eventually went on to run fixed income and equities and then moved into new areas such as structured products.

In 1995, Neuger joined AIG, where he came to oversee its global investment portfolio In seven years, Neuger had grown AIG Investments into a company with $753 billion in assets. Neuger focused on building the alternative business of hedge funds and private equity both in developed markets and emerging markets. The company had 45 asset management offices around the world, spanning Asia, Latin America, Africa, Europe and USA.

In his book Griftopia, Matt Taibbi laid a substantial portion of the liquidity crisis at AIG directly on Neuger's doorstep. According to Taibbi, in Neuger's desire to increase profits, Neuger directed his unit to invest collateral from securities lending into mortgage-backed securities, a move which Taibbi described as "moronic".

AIG Global Investment Corporation was eventually sold to Pacific Century Group, and Neuger remained as CEO. He retired as the Vice Chairman of the company in 2013.

== Philanthropy ==
Neuger was the co-chair of the board of directors of Youth, I.N.C. which in 2011 recognized him at its annual gala. Steve K. Orr, the executive director and founder of Youth, I.N.C., stated "Win's passion and drive to build Youth, I.N.C. into a first class organization has been transformational and has impacted the lives of innumerable city youth."

Neuger is the treasurer and finance chair on the board of the Robert Toigo Foundation, serves on the investment committee of the Margaret A. Cargill Foundation, and is on the board of overseers at the Tuck School of Business at Dartmouth.

== Personal life ==
Neuger is the son of a public relations executive and grew up in Edina, Minnesota.
