= FWD Group =

Insurance company based in Hong Kong

- Type: Public
- Traded as: SEHK: 1828
- Industry: Financial services (insurance)
- Founded: 2013; 13 years ago in Hong Kong
- Founder: Richard Li
- Headquarters: Hong Kong
- Areas served: Hong Kong, Macau, Thailand, Malaysia, Indonesia, the Philippines, Vietnam, Japan, Singapore, Cambodia
- Key people: Huynh Thanh Phong (CEO); Frederick Ma (Chairman); Sid Sankaran (CFO & COO); Binayak Dutta (Senior Managing Director, Southeast Asia & Group Chief Business Operations Officer)
- AUM: US$62.4 billion (2025)
- Owner: Apollo Global Management, Canada Pension Plan Investment Board, Huatai Securities, Li Ka Shing Foundation, Metro Pacific Investments and Pacific Century Group
- Number of employees: >6,900 (2025)
- Parent: Pacific Century Group
- Website: fwd.com

FWD Group is an insurance company based in Hong Kong. Founded in 2013 as the insurance arm of Pacific Century Group, the company provides life and medical insurance, general insurance and employee benefits in Asia. As of 2025, the FWD managed approximately US$62.4 billion in assets. On March 13, 2023, FWD refiled its Main Board listing application for its Hong Kong IPO, with total private placement amounting to US$1.825 billion since December 2021. The company had previously dropped a planned US IPO of up to $3 billion in 2021 amid regulatory concerns over Chinese government oversight of overseas listings, and subsequent attempts to list in Hong Kong were stalled by unfavourable market conditions. FWD eventually launched its Hong Kong IPO in June 2025, pricing 91.3 million shares at HK$38 each to raise HK$3.5 billion (US$442 million), with Mubadala Capital and Japan's T&D Holdings as cornerstone investors; the shares began trading on 7 July 2025, valuing the company at more than US$6 billion. The company filed for its IPO in 2022 and refiled its Main Board listing application with the Hong Kong Stock Exchange on March 13, 2023. On July 7, 2025, the company went public through an initial public offering on the HKEX.

The company currently operates in Hong Kong, Japan, Macau, Singapore, Thailand, Philippines, Indonesia, Vietnam, Malaysia, and Cambodia.

== History ==
=== 2010s ===
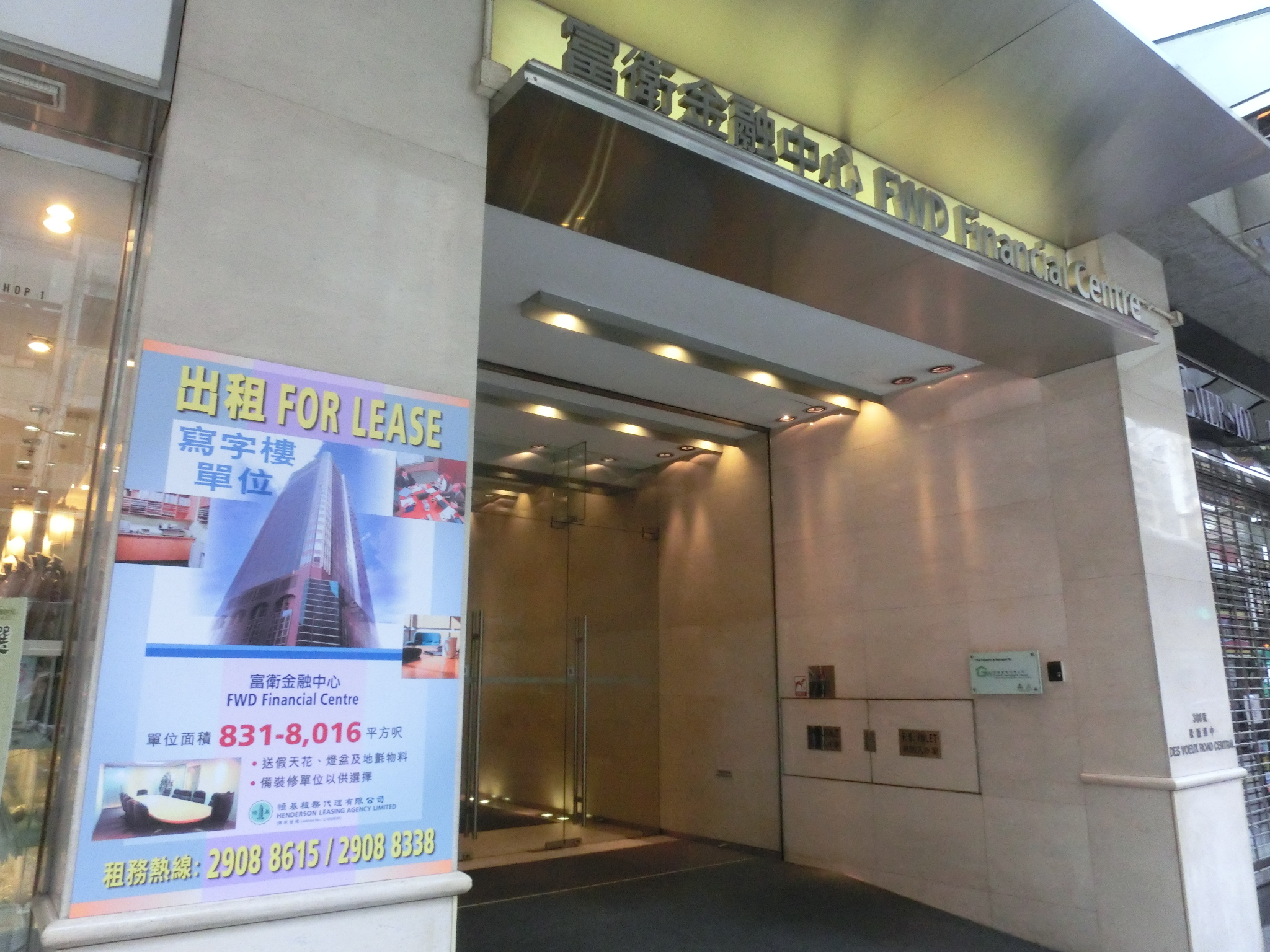
FWD Financial Centre in 2013 in Hong Kong.

Richard Li of Pacific Century Group formed FWD Group in 2013 after purchasing ING Group’s insurance and pension units in Hong Kong, Macau and Thailand for US$2.1 billion. Swiss Re bought a 12.3% stake in FWD Group in 2013 for $425 million. Huynh Thanh Phong joined as CEO in 2013. The company then expanded into the Philippines in 2014 and Indonesia in 2015. Expanding into three more countries in 2016, that year FWD Group acquired Shenton Insurance in Singapore, also purchasing a unit from Great Eastern Holdings Ltd. in Vietnam for $35 million. In late 2016, FWD agreed to buy AIG's Fuji Life Insurance Co. in Japan. The Japan acquisition fit into FWD Group's broader pan-Asian expansion strategy, with CEO Huynh Thanh Phong framing the deal as a way to gain access to an established distribution network and customer base in the country. For AIG, the divestiture was part of CEO Peter Hancock's strategy to simplify the group and free up capital for share repurchases, following pressure from activist investor Carl Icahn. In 2018 FWD agreed to purchase an Indonesian life insurance venture, PT Commonwealth Life, from the Commonwealth Bank of Australia for $300 million. When the acquisition completed in 2020, PT Commonwealth Life was rebranded PT FWD Life Indonesia. FWD Group also purchased HSBC’s stake in a Malaysian insurance joint venture in 2018, acquiring 49% of HSBC Amanah Takaful (Malaysia), now renamed FWD Takaful (Malaysia).

In 2018 FWD agreed to purchase an Indonesian life insurance venture, PT Commonwealth Life, from the Commonwealth Bank of Australia for $300 million. When the acquisition completed in 2020, PT Commonwealth Life was rebranded PT FWD Life Indonesia. FWD Group also purchased HSBC’s stake in a Malaysian insurance joint venture in 2018, acquiring 49% of HSBC Amanah Takaful (Malaysia), now renamed FWD Takaful (Malaysia).

In June 2019, FWD Group purchased MetLife's business in Hong Kong reportedly for around $400 million. That month, FWD Group agreed to buy SCB Life Assurance, the life insurance business of Thailand’s Siam Commercial Bank, for $3 billion, "reflecting the largest insurance deal in Southeast Asia in terms of value." FWD also launched its Malaysian takaful (Islamic insurance) market at the end of July 2019. By August 2019, FWD had applied for a license to enter a joint venture in China. Having spent $6 billion on mergers and acquisitions since its founding, in November 2019, FWD agreed to acquire Vietcombank-Cardif Life Insurance, a joint venture between Vietcombank and BNP Paribas Cardif, for $400 million. FWD announced in December 2019 it would exit its group medical insurance business in Singapore by December 2020.

=== 2020s ===
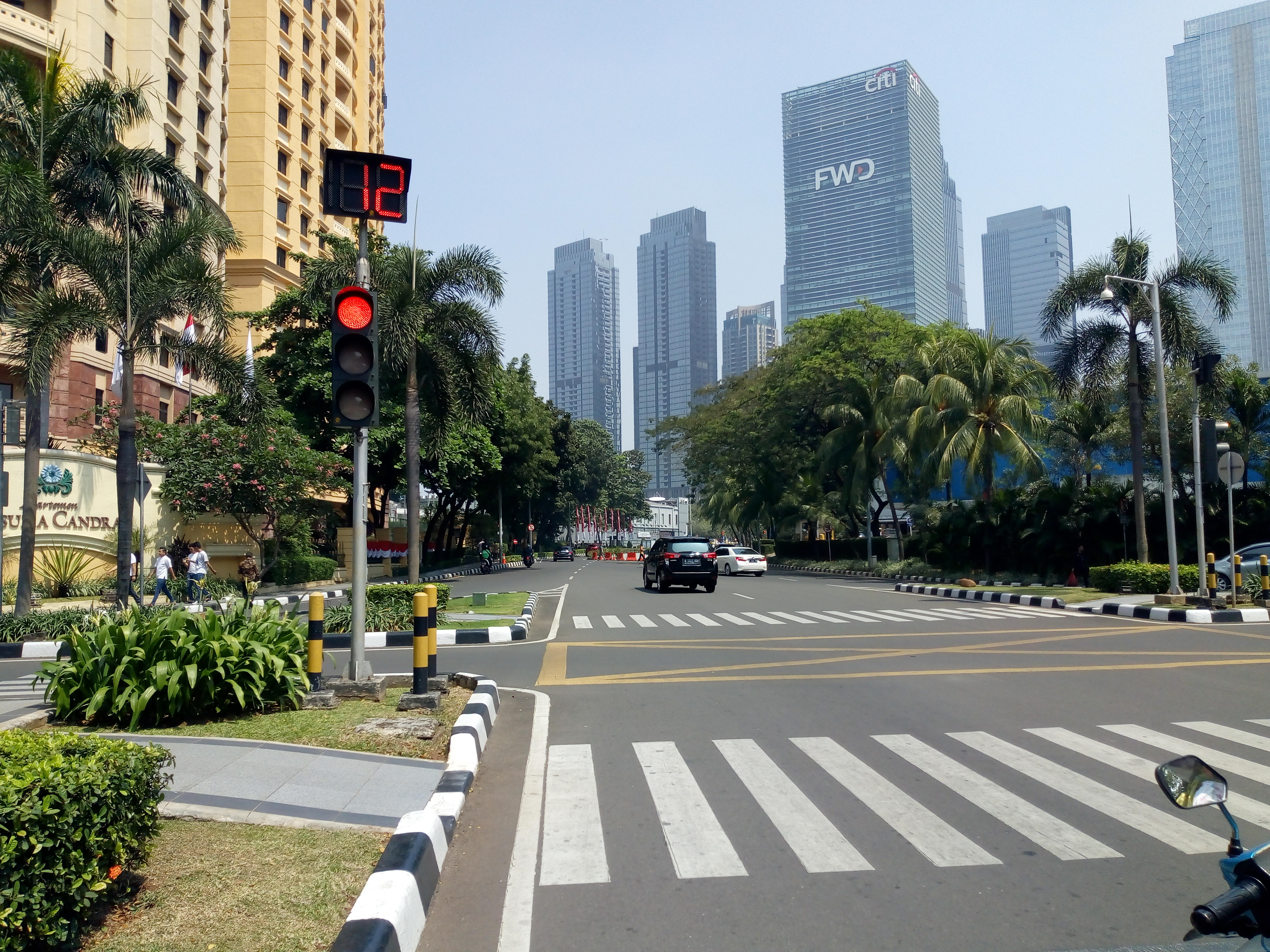
FWD Tower in Jakarta, Indonesia.

In March 2020, Prudential acquired a bancassurance partnership in Thailand from FWD Group for $753 million. The same month, FWD Vietnam Life became the largest life insurer in Vietnam by charter capital. In June 2020, FWD Group purchased a minority stake in the life insurance arm of PT Bank Rakyat Indonesia (BRI), PT Asuransi BRI Life, for a reported $300 million. By September 2020, press reported that FWD Group was considering an initial public offering in Hong Kong. That month, the company purchased a stake in IPP Financial Advisers. As of 2020, FWD Group had $50.9 billion in assets under management and 7.5 million customers. By 2021, the company managed approximately US$63 billion in assets and had 6,100 employees in Asia.

In 2022, the company's Value of New Business reached US$823 million, up 29% compared to 2021, and its segmental adjusted operating profit before tax was US$334 million, representing an 83% increase over the previous year.

In 2023, the company entered the Malaysian life insurance market through an investment in Gibraltar BSN Life Berhad, which was renamed FWD Insurance Berhad. Alongside other investors, FWD Group acquired a stake from The Prudential Insurance Company of America, a wholly owned subsidiary of the US-based, NYSE-listed Prudential Financial, Inc. (PFI). On March 13, 2023, FWD refiled its Main Board listing application for its Hong Kong IPO, with total private placement amounting to US$1.825 billion since December 2021. In May of the same year, the company appointed Sid Sankaran as a managing director and its chief financial officer (CFO). In August, FWD Group received investment-grade credit ratings from Fitch Ratings and Moody's. Fitch assigned FWD Group a long-term Issuer Default Rating (IDR) of “BBB+” with a stable outlook; Moody's assigned a Baa2 issuer rating to FWD Group with a positive outlook.

In March 2024, FWD completed an additional investment for a 21% stake in FWD Takaful Berhad, making it the majority shareholder with a 70% holding. In May of the same year, the company launched a new health business, FWD HealthyMe, and appointed Dr. Sarah Salvilla as Chief Health Officer.

For the year 2024, the company reported a net profit after tax of US$24 million, with operating profit after tax rising 29% from last year to US$463 million.

In 2025, Fitch updated FWD Group’s long-term IDR to “BBB+” with a insurer financial strength (IFS) rating of A for its core life insurance operating entities. Moody's updated FWD Group’s issuer rating to Baa1 with a notional IFS rating of A2 for its major life insurance operating. For the year 2025, the company reported an increase in net profit of US$166 million under IFRS 17 and operating profit after tax of US$499 million.

== Community involvement and corporate social responsibility ==
By April 2017, FWD had $24.4 billion in assets under management and sponsored the Clockenflap music festival.

== Business ==
Since its foundation in 2013, FWD has expanded to operate in 10 markets including Hong Kong, Macau, Thailand, Japan, Singapore, the Philippines, Indonesia, Vietnam, Malaysia, and Cambodia. Notable acquisitions of the company include MetLife's business in Hong Kong and SCB Life Assurance in Thailand.

FWD provides a range of insurance products, including life and medical insurance, general insurance, employee benefits, and health services such as FWD HealthyMe.

== See also ==
- List of insurance companies in Hong Kong
- Former Marine Police Headquarters
- FWD Tower
