= PineBridge Investments =

American investment management firm

PineBridge Investments LLC

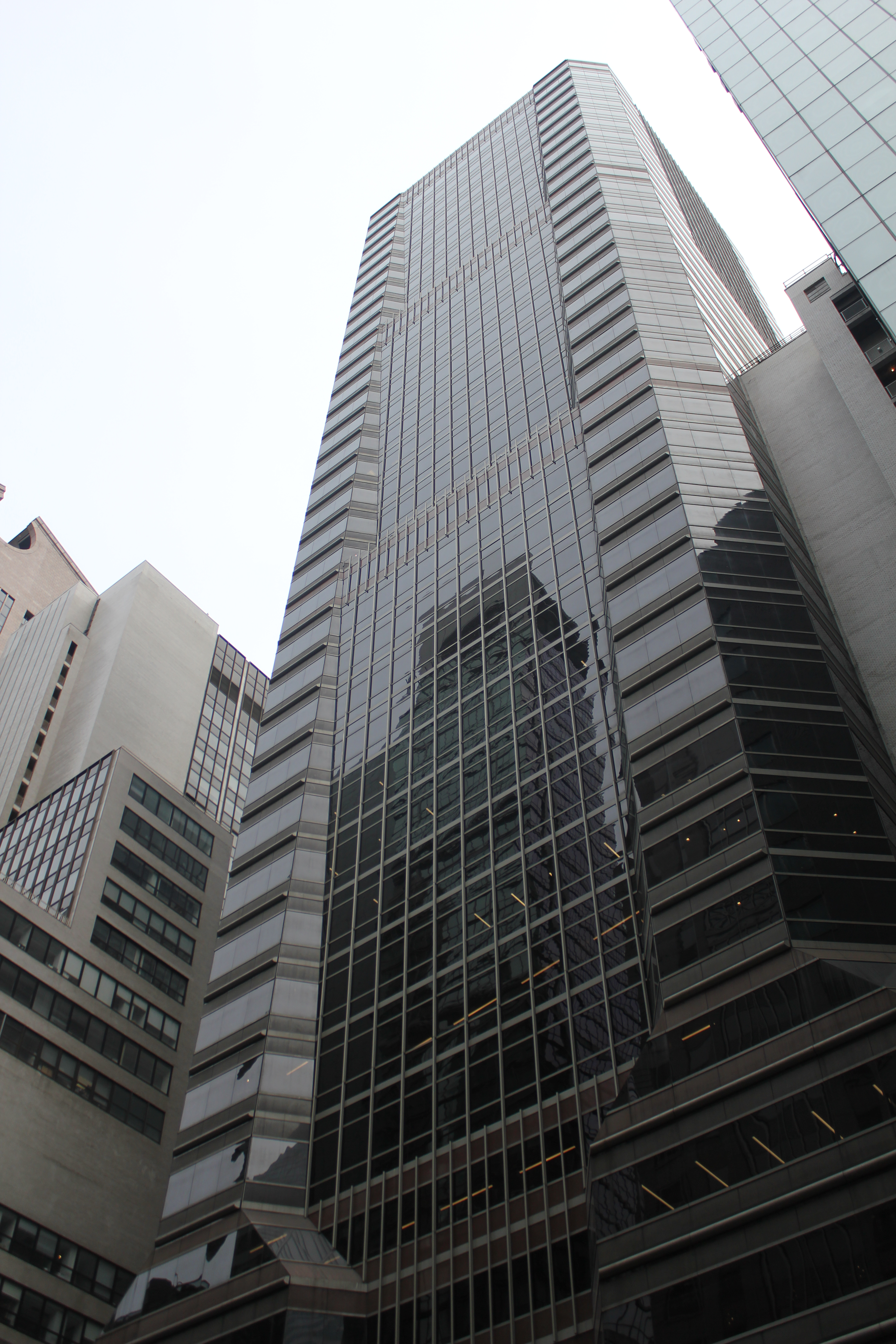
- Headquarters at Park Avenue Tower
- Formerly: AIG Investments
- Type: Subsidiary
- Industry: Investment management
- Founded: 1996; 30 years ago
- Headquarters: Park Avenue Tower, New York City, USA
- Number of locations: 24
- Key people: John L. Thornton (Non-Executive chairman); Gregory Ehret (CEO)
- AUM: US$190.3 billion (December 2024)
- Number of employees: 700+ (2024)
- Parent: MetLife
- Website: www.pinebridge.com

PineBridge Investments LLC (also known as PineBridge) is an American asset management firm that was formerly a division of American International Group (AIG) known as AIG Investments. After being sold to the Pacific Century Group (PCG) in 2010, it became known as PineBridge Investments.

== History ==
AIG Investments was formed in 1996 as an asset management division of AIG to oversee the group's $75 billion in assets, initially employing 300 people. PineBridge's predecessor consolidated AIG's various investment entities into a single platform.

After joining AIG in 1995 to lead and grow the division, Win Neuger was CIO of the former as well as CEO of the latter. In 2004, AIG Investments (AIGI) set up a joint venture with Huatai Securities forming AIG-Huatai Fund Management (now known as Huatai-PineBridge Fund Management).

By 2008, the size of AIG's investments had reached $712 billion. However, due to the financial crisis of that year, AIGI's parent company underwent significant financial difficulty and was close to bankruptcy resulting in the US government needing to spend $182 billion to bailouts.

As a result, AIG needed to sell off many of its assets to repay the government bailout. It has been speculated that Neuger was significantly responsible for AIG's near collapse due to allowing the group to take on excessive risk related to mortgage-backed securities to obtain higher profits.

In September 2009, Richard Li of Hong Kong-based PCG announced that he would acquire AIGI for $500 million. Six months later, the purchase was completed by a subsidiary of his company, Bridge Partners.

Now independent and renamed PineBridge Investments, the firm had Neuger as its first CEO after he resigned from his posts at AIG; two years later, however, Neuger left his post.

In 2020, PineBridge acquired Benson Elliot Capital, a UK based private equity real estate firm. The following year, the new entity known as PineBridge Benson Elliot LLP then acquired housing developer, Sigma Capital Group.

In December 2024, the institutional asset management arm of Metlife agreed to acquire PineBridge for $1.2 billion. The transaction was completed a year later.
