= Richard Li =

Hong Kong businessman (born 1966)

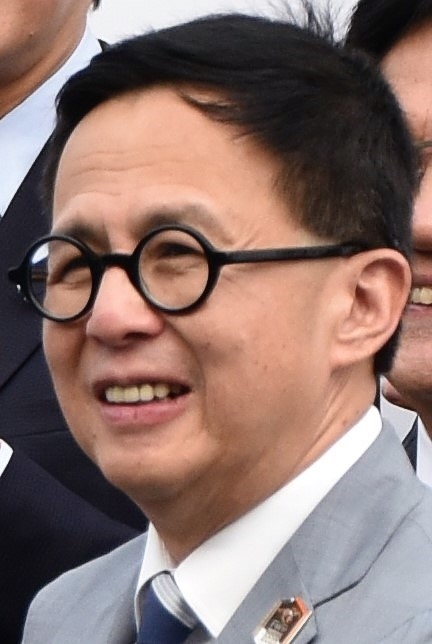
- Li attending the trophy presentation ceremony of the Queen Elizabeth II Cup at the Sha Tin Racecourse on 30 April 2023

Chairman of Hong Kong Telecom
- Incumbent
- Assumed office 11 November 2011

Chairman of Pacific Century Group
- Incumbent
- Assumed office 10 May 2004
- Preceded by: Charles Chan Kwok-keung

Chairman of PCCW
- Incumbent
- Assumed office 3 August 1999
- Preceded by: Peter Oei Hong Leong

Personal details
- Born: 8 November 1966 (age 60) Deep Water Bay, British Hong Kong
- Citizenship: Canada; China (Hong Kong)
- Domestic partner: Isabella Leong (2008–2011)
- Children: 3
- Parent(s): Li Ka-shing; Chong Yuet-ming
- Relatives: Victor Li Tzar-kuoi (brother)
- Education: Stanford University (dropped out)

Li Tzar Kai
- Traditional Chinese: 李澤楷
- Simplified Chinese: 李泽楷
Transcriptions
Standard Mandarin
- Hanyu Pinyin: Lǐ Zékǎi
Yue: Cantonese
- Yale Romanization: Léih jaahk káai
- Jyutping: Lei5 zaak6 kaai2

Richard Li Tzar-kai (born 1966) is a Hong Kong businessman. The founder and chairman of the private investment group Pacific Century Group (PCG), Li started his career in the 1990s with the founding of STAR TV, a pan-Asian television network. After founding PCG in 1993, he went on to establish PCCW and HKT Trust.

In 2010, PCG acquired the asset management business of AIG Investments and renamed it to PineBridge Investments. In 2013, PCG founded FWD Group. Li is chairman of PCG, PCCW Ltd. and HKT Limited. He is also on the boards of companies including Pinebridge Investments. Forbes listed his net worth in 2020 at $4.5 billion, 20th richest in Hong Kong.

== Early life and education ==
Li was born in 1966 at his parents' residence in 79 Deep Water Bay Road, Deep Water Bay, Hong Kong, Richard Li Tzar-kai is the youngest son of businessman Li Ka-shing. Li and his older brother Victor spent their childhoods in Hong Kong, where Li attended St. Paul's Co-educational College. He left Hong Kong at age thirteen to be educated at Menlo School in Atherton, California. In high school, he worked at McDonald's and as a caddy at the local golf course. He studied computer engineering at Stanford University until 1987. Citing personal reasons, he withdrew from university after three years.

== Career ==
=== Founding PCG ===
For the first three years of his career, Li managed funds at an investment bank in Toronto, Canada, acquiring Canadian citizenship in the 1980s. In 1990 he began working in the fund-management department at Hutchison Whampoa in Hong Kong. At Hutchison Whampoa, he was an executive director from 1992 until 1993 and deputy chairman from 1993 until 2000.

In 1990, Li began building his own company, STAR TV, a pan-Asian satellite-television network that streamed American television. According to Wired magazine, the service "triggered a vast cultural shift, injecting a massive dose of Western popular entertainment into... more than 50 countries [by 2005]." STAR TV proved lucrative, and in 1993 and 1995 Li sold the network to Rupert Murdoch for a total of US$950.5 million.

Using the funds raised from the sale of STAR TV, in 1993 Li founded Pacific Century Group (PCG), an Asia-based investment group with Li as CEO and chairman. Li subsequently oversaw PCG's investments in real estate, financial services, technology, and media & telecommunications.

He was an executive director at Hongkong Electric Holdings from 1993 until 2000, and chairman of Singapore-based Pacific Century Regional Developments Limited starting in 1994, a role he still held in 2020.

=== PCCW and HKT Trust ===
In 1996, Li Zekai established Pacific Century CyberWorks (PCCW). The company's chairman starting in 1999, he remained chairman when the company changed its name to PCCW Ltd. in 2002.

In his early financial dealings with PCCW, his Canadian citizenship allowed him to bid on companies such as Air Canada and Bell Canada Enterprises without running afoul of restrictions on foreign ownership. PCCW acquired Cable & Wireless HKT for US$38 billion in 2000, in "what was then Asia's largest corporate takeover." The acquisition made PCCW the largest fixed-lined network and wireless operator in Hong Kong. Li joined the board of the Bank of East Asia in 2001, retaining the role until 2017.

In 2004, he created the property company PCPD, or Pacific Century Premium Developments, as a spinoff from PCCW, and was chairman of PCPD from 2004 until 2019.

As chairman of both PCCW and PCCW's executive committee, in 2011 Li was involved in the spinoff and initial public offering of PCCW's telecommunications assets on the Hong Kong Stock Exchange. With the spinoff named HKT Trust, the listing plan was approved by the exchange in June 2011 and PCCW shareholders on 12 October 2011, allowing for the creation of Hong Kong's first publicly traded business trust. The IPO ultimately raised around $1.2 billion. with PCCW maintaining a majority interest in both HKT Trust and HKT Limited. In November 2011, Li became chairman of HKT Trust, HKT Limited, and HKT's executive committee.

With Li as chairman, in December 2013 HKT agreed to acquire CSL New World Mobility, a subsidiary of Telstra, for HK$18.8 billion. The transaction was completed in early 2014. In March 2015, PCCW Media acquired the mobile video provider Vuclip, and launched the streaming service Viu. Viu was rolled out to 24 markets globally over the next two years, and, by 2017, Viu, Vuclip, and the music streaming service MOOV had been bundled into the company PCCW OTT. That August, PCCW OT secured new investors including Hony Capital, Foxconn Ventures and Temasek. Li was 15th in the Forbes list of Hong Kong's 50 richest people for 2017. The same publication named him 385th in the list of the world's billionaires, with an estimated fortune of $4.3 billion.

=== PineBridge and FWD Group ===
In September 2009, Li oversaw PCG's acquisition of AIG Investments for around $500 million, renaming the asset management company PineBridge Investments.

Re-entering the insurance business, in March 2013, Li's PCG acquired the Hong Kong, Macau and Thailand insurance business of ING Groep N.V. for $2.1 billion, renaming it FWD Group. With backing by Swiss Re, Li expanded FWD Group through acquisitions, appointing Ronald Arculli as FWD chairman in October 2013. In 2015, Li then appointed former Canadian foreign affairs minister John Baird as a non-executive director to both FWD and PineBridge. By 2016, Li had overseen FWD's expansion into Indonesia, the Philippines, Singapore, Vietnam and Japan.

=== Recent developments ===
After Li purchased the Hanazono resort in Niseko, Hokkaido in 2007 through his company Pacific Century Premium Developments, development was delayed by the 2011 earthquake and tsunami disaster.

By 2018, he had invested a total of US$930 million in the project, with an onsen, apartments, and two hotels including a Park Hyatt nearing completion by late 2019.

In 2018,Li was quoted stating that his insurance businesses took up "70% to 80% of his time," with Li focused on expanding FWD in the Southeast Asian markets. In 2019, FWD had around $30 billion in assets under management. Also in 2019,Li's HKT announced it was establishing one of the first licensed virtual banks in Hong Kong, and in 2020 launched 5G wireless services. Under Li, the insurance group bolttech was launched in early 2020.

He continued to chair Pacific Century Group in 2020, and remained chairman of PCCW Ltd. and HKT Limited. Also on the boards of companies such as PineBridge, Li oversees PCCW subsidiaries such as PCCW Media and the IT and business process outsourcing company PCCW Solutions. As of December 2020, Forbes estimated his net worth at $4.5 billion, ranking him 20th on its list of the richest businesspeople in Hong Kong, and 401st on its list of the world's billionaires.

== Boards and public positions ==
Li is currently a member of the Global Information Infrastructure Commission, the United Nations, and the Center for Strategic and International Studies' International Councillors Group in Washington DC. He was previously the Governor of the World Economic Forum for Information Technologies and Telecommunications, as well as a representative of the Hong Kong government at the APEC Business Advisory Council (ABAC) from 2009 to 2014. He was praised by the Secretary for Commerce and Economic Development, Rita Lau, for "helping [to] raise Hong Kong's profile in this important regional business forum".

Li was a council member of the Chinese University of Hong Kong, but his association with the university has since ended. He is a full member of the Hong Kong Computer Society.

== Philanthropy ==
In 2006, Li donated CA$1 million to the Canadian National Arts Centre Foundation in Ottawa, which led to the establishment of the Annual Richard Li Young Artist Chair, putting young musicians each year under the mentorship of musical maestros.

Through PCCW, Li has overseen a number of relief efforts and charity programs. During the 2002–03 SARS outbreak, PCCW provided telecommunication services to patients, medical staff, and fundraisers. Li also established a story time program for children kept home to prevent infection, and call centre support for charity fundraisers and community activists. Under Li, PCCW also donated $1 million to the Business Community Relief Fund for Victims of SARS, with employees volunteering man-hours as well. Later in 2007, PCCW volunteers participated in the District Elderly Campaign, which delivers gift packages to the elderly.

After the outbreak of the COVID-19 pandemic,Li's PCG donated surgical masks to health care workers and NGOs in Hong Kong in February 2020.

== Recognition ==
Li was awarded the Lifetime Achievement Award by the Cable and Satellite Broadcasting Association of Asia in November 2011. He has also been presented with a Queen Elizabeth II Diamond Jubilee medal for "outstanding business and charitable contributions to Canada."

== Personal life ==
Li's girlfriend Isabella Leong, a former Hong Kong singer, gave birth to their son Ethan in April 2008, followed by twin sons in June 2010. Leong announced in March 2011 that the couple had amicably ended their relationship and that both would be caring for the children. Li is a licensed pilot in the United States and Canada, as well as a licensed divemaster. In 2016, Li bought his own top-level domain (.richardli) for $250,000.
