= Ka-shing (given name) =

Ka-shing is a given name. Notable people with the surname include:

- Lau Ka Shing (born 1989), Hong Kong footballer
- Li Ka-shing (born 1928), Hong Kong business magnate
- Martin Lee Ka-shing (born 1971), Hong Kong businessman

== See also ==
- Ka shing (disambiguation)
