= Bank Simpanan Nasional =

Government owned bank based in Malaysia

- The company's logo traditionally features the pohon pitis which symbolises grown and wealth. Following a corporate rebranding exercise on 15 October 2015, the logo's coin branch number was updated from 13 to 14 to represent all of Malaysia’s states and federal territories (note the additional coin branch at the tip), while the logo colours have also been changed to a fresh teal and white from its original blue and yellow to symbolise trustworthiness and reliability.

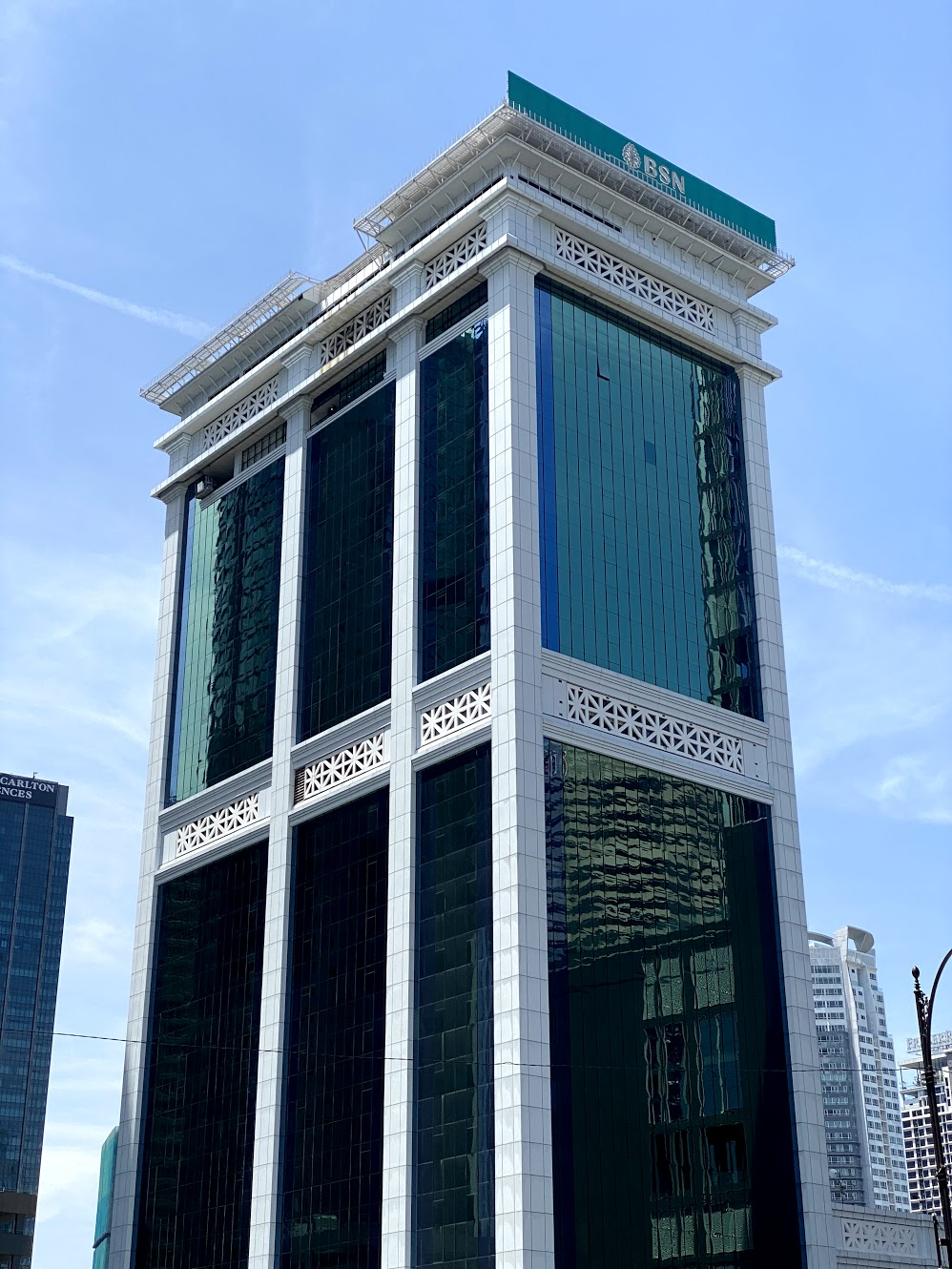
- Wisma BSN (Headquarters) in Kuala Lumpur
- Type: State-owned enterprise
- Industry: Banking
- Founded: 1 December 1974
- Founder: Government of Malaysia
- Headquarters: Kuala Lumpur, Malaysia
- Number of locations: 390 branches (As of February 2021)
- Key people: Jay Khairil Jeremy as CEO
- Products: Banking and Finance
- Revenue: ▲RM1.04 billion (2019)
- Number of employees: 7,400 (As of February 2021)
- Website: https://www.bsn.com.my/

Original BSN Logo (1974–2015)

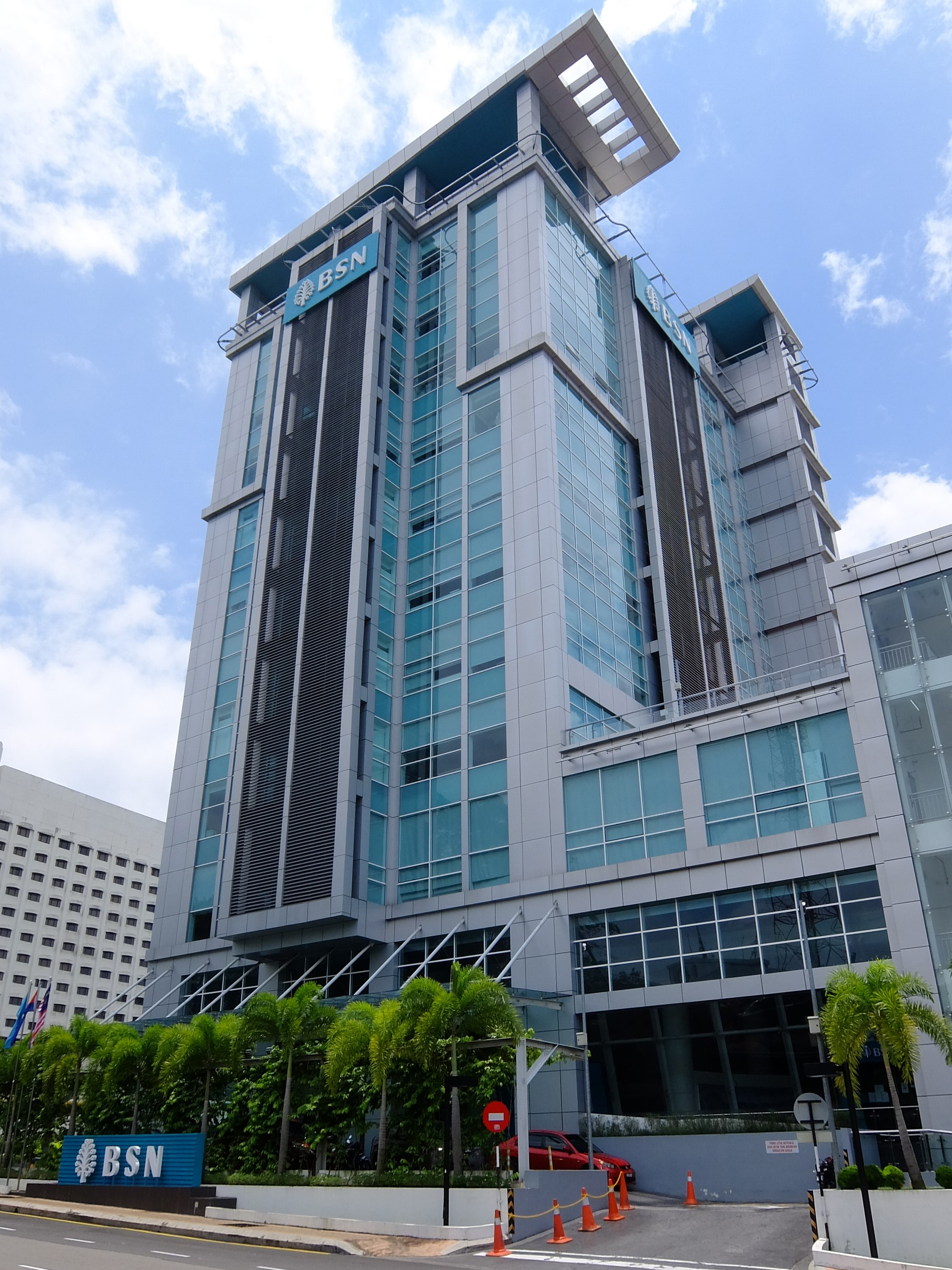
BSN Tower in Johor Bahru

Bank Simpanan Nasional or BSN (translated as National Savings Bank and also abbreviated as NSB) is a government-owned savings bank based in Malaysia. It offers banking services via BSN branches and BSN Banking Agents (EB BSN).

With roots originated in the 19th century during British Colonial Rule as Post Office Savings Bank, the bank evolved into an independent savings institution under Bank Simpanan Nasional Act 1974, which separate the savings functions from the Postal Service Department and placed it directly under Ministry of Finance oversight as a Federal Agency.

== History ==
=== Early Post Office Savings Banks ===
Late 19th century Malaya did not have a unified central postal savings system. The Straits Settlements Post Office Savings Bank was founded on 1 January 1877 as part of the Postal Services Department in the Straits Settlements of Penang, Malacca and Singapore. Perak and Selangor Savings Banks were established in 1888 and 1893 respectively. In 1907, these two Banks were merged into the Federated Malay States Post Office Savings Bank (Malay: Bank Simpanan Pejabat Pos). The Unfederated Malay States however had their own Post Office Savings Banks years before the Second World War (including Johor and Kedah in 1938 and Kelantan in 1939).

When Japanese occupied Malaya, Singapore and the British Borneo Territories, postal savings systems in all states came under the Dai Nippon Post Office Savings Bank control. However, few years before the end of the second world war, the jurisdiction of the Four Malay States were briefly transferred to Thai Postal Administration.

=== Post War Reforms ===
Following the end of the Second World War and the dissolution of the Straits Settlements, the 1948 Savings Bank Ordinance came into effect and on 1 January 1949, POSB in Singapore was separated from the other post office savings banks in Malaya, with the bank's assets and liabilities split between Singapore and Malaya. However, operations of the Singapore POSB remained under the jurisdiction of the Postmaster-General of Malaya until 1966 when Singapore as a newly independent city state took full control of the bank. The Singapore chapter of POSB eventually became the POSB Bank in 1972.

Following the establishment of Malaysia in 16 September 1963, the Malayan POSB became the West Malaysia POSB. Meanwhile in Borneo, only Sarawak had a POSB which was set up in 1925. It remained a separate entity from Malaya until 1972, when the Savings Bank Ordinance was extended there, resulting in a single unified POSB for Malaysia. Sabah, on the other hand, never had Postal Savings Service until 15 May 1968, when the same Ordinance was first applied to the State.

Prior to the savings bank unification, the Sarawak POSB (under colonial rule) was governed by the Sarawak Post Office Savings Bank Ordinance 1957, while North Borneo (now Sabah) passed a legislation in 1954 to establish its own savings bank which however never went into operation.

=== Establishment of National Savings Bank ===
By the 1960s, the deposit in the Post Office Savings Banks suffered a decline due to rise of Commercial Bankings in urban areas, with an increase in annual growth rate of 5.8% in savings deposits compared to 18.1% of commercial banks. To ensure their relevance and competitiveness, the federal government (with the help of the Central Bank of Malaysia) decided to establish a new institution to replace the Post Office Savings Bank.

Following a Royal Assent of the Bank bill passed by parliament on 30 July 1974, the gazette was published on 22 August the same year.

Bank Simpanan Nasional was incorporated on 1 December 1974 under the Bank Simpanan Nasional Act 1974, effectively split the bank from the Malaysian Postal Service Department (which later corporatised as Pos Malaysia Berhad in 1992), and upon which the bank took over all assets, liabilities, and responsibilities of the former POSB, as the former Post Office Savings Bank Ordinance 1948 was simultaneously repealed. Since then, it became a federal agency and statutory board with its own board of directors and constitution and is directly responsible to the Minister of Finance on basic issues.

On 5 December 1974, the newly established National Savings Bank was launched by then-Prime Minister of Malaysia, Abdul Razak Hussein at the Tunku Abdul Rahman Hall in Kuala Lumpur, with Syed Nahar as the bank's first Chairman. The bank headquarters in Kuala Lumpur began operations by leasing office spaces at the newly-built Wisma Pahlawan near Jalan Sulaiman for a period of four years.

On 7 July 1977, it became a member of the International Savings Bank Institute (now known as World Savings and Retail Banks Institute) as part of the Asia-Pacific Member Group.

To foster a consistent savings habit and promote financial inclusion across Malaysia, the BSN Premium Savings Certificate initiative (known as Sijil Simpanan Premium or BSN SSP in Malay) was launched on 1 January 1978. It combines Shariah-compliant wealth accumulation with the excitement of lucky draws, giving customers a chance to win prizes like cars, motorcycles or cash payouts. Early days Certificates were handed out in the form of a traditional paper.

In the beginning, BSN only had 13 main branches nationwide in each state capital and operations were mostly conducted in post offices until 1986, when the bank was reorganised and few branches were added to provide better services to the public in places like universities, shopping complexes or commercial areas.

To attract more depositors, it introduced automated teller machines (ATMs) in 1983, following similar moves by other financial institutions.

During this transitional period, the post office was continuing to perform its old savings collection functions, such as accepting deposits only in rural areas and savings deposits in areas where no ATM facilities existed and the use of post offices and postal vans in areas that lack access to banking services.

In 1987, it introduced Giro Service as its core product to ease transfer of money between banks.

== Subsidiaries and associates ==
The agency has subsidiaries and associates which are involved in asset management, insurance and takaful:

=== Subsidiaries ===
- Permodalan BSN Berhad (fully-owned, unit trust fund management)
- Prudential BSN Takaful Berhad (takaful, with 51% share)

=== Associates ===
- FWD BSN Holdings (life insurance)
- BSNC Corporation Sdn Bhd

== Senior leadership ==
According to Bank Simpanan Nasional Act 1974 Part 3 (Constitution of the Bank) Section 6, there shall be a "Board of Directors" constituted under subsection (2), which shall be responsible for the policy and overall administration of the affairs and business of the Bank.

Members of the Board of Directors appointed by the Minister (of Finance) comprise of—

- a Chairman;
- a representative of the Ministry of Finance, who shall be the Deputy Chairman;
- not less than four other directors, who shall be persons of standing and experience in matters relating to banking, business or industry; and
- the Chief Executive. (General Manager before 2006)

The current members of the board are as follows:

- Chairman: Awang Adek Hussin (since 1 July 2024)
- Chief Executive/Executive Director: Jay Khairil Jeremy Abdullah (since 3 February 2021)
- Non-Executive Directors:
  - Mohd Hassan Ahmad (non-independent; since 15 February 2024)
  - Selamat Sirat (independent; since 14 June 2017)
  - Zaimah Zakaria (independent; since 25 March 2018)
  - Saleena Mohd Ali (independent; since 1 November 2023)
  - Suraya Hassan (independent; since 2 January 2024)
  - Kamaruzaman Noordin (independent; since 2 January 2024)
  - Noor Muzir Mohamed Kassim (independent; since 1 May 2026)

=== List of former chairmen and chairwomen ===
No	Name	Tenure
1	Syed Nahar Tun Syed Sheh Shahabuddin	1974–1985
2	Ani Arope	1986–1988
3	Zubir Embong	1989–1993
4	Ahmad Zahid Hamidi	1994–1999
5	Abdul Azim Mohd Zabidi	1999–2009
6	Nozirah Bahari	2009–2013
7	Abu Bakar Abdullah	2013–2019
8	Razali Othman	2019–2020
9	(Mrs) Rossana Annizah Ahmad Rashid	2020–2023

=== List of former general managers and chief executives ===
No	Name	Tenure
1	Zainuddin Bachik	1974–1984
2	Mohd Kaza Abd Aziz	1985–1999
3	Abu Huraira Abu Yazid	2000–2004
4	Tajuddin Atan	2006–2007
5	Adinan Maning	2008–2017
6	Yunos Abd Ghani	2018–2020

== See also ==
- POSB Bank (Singapore counterpart)
- List of banks in Malaysia
- Pos Malaysia
