= Ka-shing (disambiguation) =

Ka shing may refer to:

- Li Ka-shing
- Li Ka Shing Faculty of Medicine
- Li Ka-shing Family
- Li Ka Shing Foundation
- Ka Shing Court
- Ka shing, given name
