= Gibraltar BSN =

Gibraltar BSN Life Berhad
- Company type: Private limited company
- Industry: Insurance
- Founded: 2014; 12 years ago
- Headquarters: Level 21, Mercu 2, No. 3, Jalan Bangsar, KL EcoCity, 59200 Kuala Lumpur, Malaysia
- Key people: Y.Bhg. Dato' Haji Kamil Khalid Ariff (Chairman); Rangam Bir (CEO)
- Products: Life insurance
- Revenue: ▲RM397 million (2016)
- Net income: ▲RM9 million (2016)
- Total assets: ▼RM2,217 million (2016)
- Total equity: ▲RM405 million (2016)
- Parent: Gibraltar BSN Holdings Sdn Bhd: Prudential Financial Inc. (70%); Bank Simpanan Nasional (30%)
- Website: www.gibraltarbsn.com

Gibraltar BSN Life Berhad is a Malaysian life insurance company. It is a joint venture between U.S.-based Prudential Financial Inc. (PFI) and Bank Simpanan Nasional (BSN).

The company was formerly known as Uni.Asia Life Assurance and was a joint venture between United Overseas Bank and DRB-HICOM. Uni.Asia Life itself was the successor to EON CMG Life Assurance Berhad from 2003. Uni.Asia Life was sold to PFI and BSN in 2014 for RM518 million. PFI and BSN hold 70 and 30 percent stakes in the company respectively. (A 69 percent stake in UOB and DRB-HICOM's general insurance JV, Uni.Asia General Insurance, was sold separately to Liberty Mutual for RM374 million.)

PFI is an asset management and life insurance provider in the U.S. with US$1.2 trillion of assets under management in June 2015. It was attracted to the venture due to opportunities for growth stemming from the low life insurance penetration rate in Malaysia. BSN is a statutory body under the Ministry of Finance responsible for encouraging savings and financial management among Malaysians, with retail deposits of RM12 billion in 2013.

The company's name is derived from PFI's logo which incorporates an image of the Rock of Gibraltar. Its stated expansion plan is to offer easy-to-understand products, target the semi-rural and rural population, and leverage on BSN's eight million-strong customer base. It had an 800-strong agency force in April 2014.

BSN also has a takaful JV with Prudential plc of the UK, Prudential BSN Takaful Berhad. PFI of the United States is not affiliated in any manner with Prudential plc, a company incorporated in the United Kingdom.
