= Fuji Fire and Marine Insurance =

Japanese insurance company

The Fuji Fire and Marine Insurance Co., Ltd.
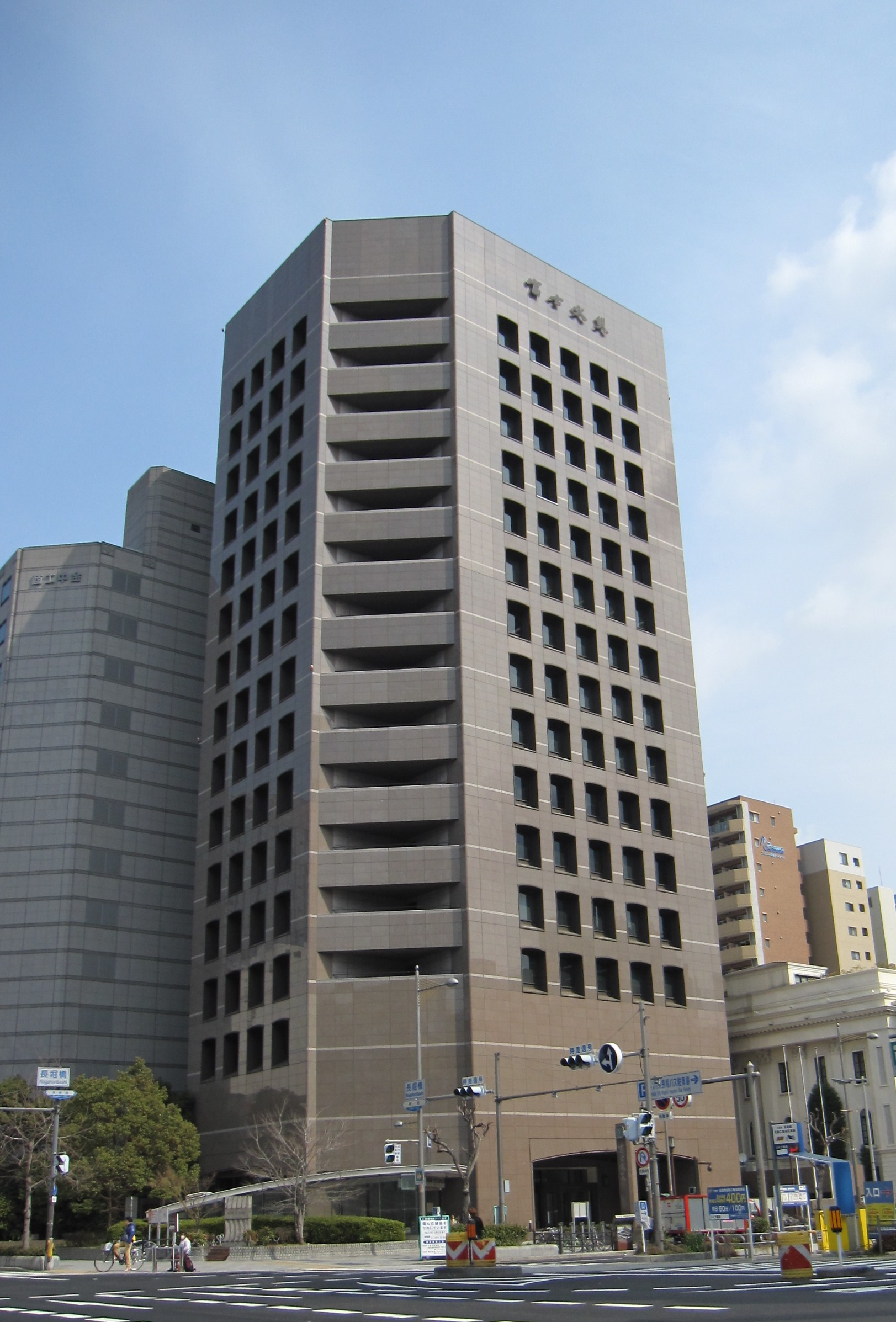
- Former headquarters building in Chuo Ward, Osaka City. Current SR Building Nagahori
- Industry: Insurance business
- Headquarters: Toranomon, Minato- ku, Tokyo 105-8602
- Area served: Japan
- Key people: Representative Director, President and CEO Takami Yokoyama
- Products: Non-life insurance
- Operating income: -¥28,473 million; -US$190 million (2017)
- Total assets: ¥824,308 million; US$5.5 billion (2017)
- Number of employees: Consolidated: 5,966 people Non-consolidated: 5,653 people (as of 31 March 2011)
- Website: web.archive.org/web/20171202043700/http://www.fujikasai.co.jp/

The Fuji Fire and Marine Insurance Co., Ltd. (富士火災海上保険株式会社, Fuji Kasai Kaijō Hoken Kabushiki Kaisha) was a Japanese insurance company. The company had its corporate headquarters in the Kamiyacho MT Building (神谷町MTビル Kamiyachō MT Biru) located in the Toranomon neighborhood of Minato, Tokyo. It also had an Osaka office in Chuo-ku borough, Osaka. Due to a merger, the company is now AIG General Insurance Co., Ltd.

In 2013, it had about 23,000 agencies throughout Japan, 172 sales offices, and 109 claims offices.

== Overview ==
Overview After the collapse of the bubble economy, the company faced a business crisis, and to stabilize its business, it received investments from Orix Corporation (22.19%) and AIG Group (22.14% ) from March 2002, but the group of both companies It wasn't a company. However, due to both the company's desire to strengthen its financial base and AIG's desire to concentrate resources on non-life insurance, a Through a third-party allotment, the AIG Group as a whole would own 41.8% of the company, and it was planned to become a company under AIG.

Subsequently, on 31 March 2010, we conducted a third-party allotment of capital to Chartis, an AIG-affiliated non-life insurance holding company, and became a Chartis group company. In November 2012, AIG Group announced that it would repurpose AIG as a brand. The brand returned from Chartis to AIG, emphasizing its affiliation with the AIG Group.

In April 2013, AIG reorganized AIG Japan Holdings Co., Ltd. as a holding company for its insurance business in Japan. It became a wholly owned subsidiary of AIG Japan Holdings.

In January 2018, it was merged with AIU Sompo Insurance Co., Ltd. and dissolved. AIU General Insurance Co., Ltd. changed its trade name to AIG General Insurance Co., Ltd.

== History ==
• 1918 – Kojiro Inoue establishes Japan Postal Fire Insurance Co., Ltd
• 1927 – The head office building is moved to its current location at 1-18-11 Minamisenba, Chuo-ku, Osaka
• 1941 – Merged with Tokiwa Simple Fire Insurance Co., Ltd
• 1949 – Changed trade name to Fuji Fire and Marine Insurance Co., Ltd
• 1953 – Listed on the Osaka Stock Exchange
• 1961 – Listed on the Tokyo Stock Exchange
• 2002 – Orix and AIG take capital participation.
• 2007 – Received a recommendation from the Kyoto Labor Bureau to correct unpaid overtime work, and it was discovered that unpaid overtime wages had been paid
• 2010 – Becomes a member of Chartis, an AIG affiliate. Business alliance with AIG Star Life Insurance (sales of life insurance products handled by AIG Star)
• 2011 – Chartis Japan Capital Co, a unit of the American International Group Inc., acquired 43.59% of the outstanding shares not already owned Fuji Fire and Marine. On 30 March 2011 Chartis was to own 98.25% of Fuji Fire and Marine, making it a wholly owned subsidiary. Fuji Fire and Marine was to be delisted from the stock exchanges as a result.
• 2013 – Becomes a wholly owned subsidiary of AIG Japan Holdings, AIG's insurance holding company. Subsidiary Fuji Life Insurance changed its trade name to AIG Fuji Life Insurance
• 2016 – Moved the head office location to 4-3-20 Toranomon, Minato, Tokyo
• 2017 – Transferred all shares of subsidiary AIG Fuji Life Insurance to FWD Group, a subsidiary of Pacific Century Group.
• 2018 – Merged with AIU General Insurance Co., Ltd. and dissolved. AIU General Insurance Co., Ltd. changed its trade name and became AIG General Insurance Co., Ltd.
