= Netvigator =

- Product type: internet service provider
- Current owner: PCCW; (via Hong Kong Telecommunications (HKT) Limited)
- Produced by: PCCW
- Country: Hong Kong (headquarters)
- Related brands: 1O1O, csl, Now TV
- Markets: Hong Kong
- Website: www.netvigator.com

Netvigator

Netvigator is a residential Internet service provider in Hong Kong, operated as a brand of Hong Kong Telecom, a subsidiary of PCCW.
