= Viu (streaming service) =

Hong Kong streaming service

- Company type: Subsidiary
- Website type: OTT platform
- Available in: English, Chinese, Arabic, Malay, Indonesian, Burmese, Thai, Filipino
- Headquarters: Hong Kong
- Area served: Hong Kong, Singapore, Malaysia, Thailand, Philippines, United Arab Emirates, Bahrain, Egypt, Indonesia, Jordan, Kuwait, Oman, Qatar, Saudi Arabia, Myanmar and South Africa
- Owners: Viu International Ltd (PCCW Media Limited) (70%); Canal+ Group (Bolloré) (30%)
- Products: Viu app; Viu Originals
- Services: Video on demand
- Website: www.viu.com
- Commercial: Yes
- Launched: August 2015; 11 years ago
- Current status: Active

Viu (pronounced as view) is a Hong Kong-based over-the-top (OTT) streaming television service from PCCW Media Group's Viu International Ltd. Operated in a dual-revenue model comprising subscriptions and advertising, Viu delivers content in different genres from Asia's top content providers with local language subtitles, as well as original production series under the Viu Original initiative (similar to original programming from other services like Disney+, Amazon Prime Video and Netflix).

Viu is now available in 16 markets across Asia, Africa and the Middle East including Hong Kong, Singapore, Thailand, Philippines, United Arab Emirates, Bahrain, Egypt, Indonesia, Jordan, Kuwait, Malaysia, Oman, Qatar, Saudi Arabia, Myanmar and South Africa. As of December 2022 annual results, Viu had an estimated 66.5 million monthly active users.

== History ==
Viu International Ltd launched the Viu OTT video service in Hong Kong on 26 October 2015.

In January 2016, Viu announced its official launch in Singapore.

In March 2016, Viu announced its official launch in India and Malaysia.

In May 2016, Viu launches in Indonesia.

In November 2016, Viu announced its official launch in the Philippines and has achieved four million users and over 218 million video views.

In February 2017, Viu was available in major Middle East countries including Bahrain, Egypt, Jordan, Kuwait, Oman, Qatar, Saudi Arabia and the United Arab Emirates.

In May 2017, Viu announced its official launch in Thailand and has expanded to 15 markets across Asia and the Middle East countries.

In September 2018, Viu announced its official launch in Myanmar.

In March 2019, Viu announced its official launch in South Africa.

In December 2019, Viu announced its suspension of operations in India without providing a date. On 5 November 2021, Viu stopped its services in India.

In June 2023, PCCW and the Canal+ Group announced a strategic partnership between the two companies, under which Canal+ will invest $300 million, including an initial investment of $200 million, in Viu and gain a 26.1% minority stake in the streaming service, with the option to invest further and gain a 51% controlling stake. The partnership serves as a catalyst for international expansions for both PCCW and Canal+ as well as collaborations between Viu and Canal+ on original productions.

== Content ==
Viu offers a wide-range catalogue of movies and TV shows from across Asia, including popular and new titles. First-run TV episodes are available on the platform with advertisements in between, at least 72 hours after broadcast; Paid users can access episodes without advertisements, at least eight hours after broadcast. Several titles are also available separately in localized language audio dub.

Movie titles available on the platform, mostly from its sister network (now Baogu Movies) or partnered (tvN Movies), require active Premium subscription.

=== Original programming ===
Viu has begun producing their original titles, in which most of their originals was based in Southeast Asia that has already received multiple award recognitions such as Asian Academy Creative Awards and Asian Television Awards. They also produce originals for the Middle East and Africa as well, as well as previously produced their originals for the Indian markets.

==== Drama ====
Title	Genre	Premiere	Seasons	Runtime	Language	Status
The Publicist	Workplace romantic drama	22 November 2017	13 episodes	27–47 min	Indonesian	Miniseries
Sunshine	Coming-of-age romantic drama	31 May 2018	13 episodes	40–44 min	Indonesian	Miniseries
Jibril	Suspense legal drama	22 October 2018 (Note: Also aired on ntv7 (Rated P13 version))	1 season, 10 episodes	44–58 min	Malay	Ended
Knock Out Girl	Romantic sports drama	12 December 2018	13 episodes	42–48 min	Indonesian	Miniseries
Devoted	Neo-noir romantic thriller	28 March 2019	1 season, 10 episodes	46–53 min	Malay	Ended
Rewrite	Romantic fantasy drama	15 May 2019	13 episodes	48–51 min	Indonesian	Miniseries
Black	Fantasy crime thriller	17 December 2019	2 seasons, 18 episodes	42–57 min	Malay	Pending
Pretty Little Liars	Cozy mystery teen drama	22 April 2020	2 seasons, 22 episodes	41–57 min	Indonesian; English	Pending
Ganjil (Wonderers)	Romantic fantasy drama	25 September 2021	1 season, 10 episodes	46–59 min	Malay	Ended
Still	Musical ensemble drama	26 November 2021	1 season, 8 episodes	41–54 min	Tagalog	Ended
Remember 15	Teen mystery horror thriller	22 February 2022	12 episodes	47–57 min	Thai	Miniseries
Wannabe	Coming-of-age hip-hop musical drama	10 May 2022	16 episodes	49–54 min	Thai	Miniseries
Finding the Rainbow	Romantic melodrama	9 November 2022	14 episodes	47–78 min	Thai	Miniseries
Hilang (Buried Sins)	Supernatural crime thriller	17 November 2022	1 season, 10 episodes	51–58 min	Malay	Pending
Nenek Bongkok Tiga (The House on Autumn Hill)	Supernatural mystery thriller	9 February 2023	1 season, 10 episodes	39–60 min	Malay	Pending
Bidadari Bermata Bening (A Beautiful Angel)	Romantic drama	31 March 2023	1 season, 10 episodes	49–58 min	Indonesian	Pending
Alter-Naratif (Electric Dust Agency)	Science fiction psychological thriller	25 May 2023	1 season, 8 episodes	45–51 min	Malay	Pending
Get Rich	Teen drama	5 July 2023	16 episodes	46–53 min	Thai	Miniseries

==== Comedy ====
Title	Genre	Premiere	Seasons	Runtime	Language	Status
Switch	Romantic fantasy comedy drama	14 August 2017	13 episodes	20–30 min	Indonesian	Miniseries
Halustik	Coming-of-age romantic comedy	12 September 2018	13 episodes	45–54 min	Indonesian	Miniseries
Salon	Dark comedy thriller	17 September 2018	1 season, 10 episodes	41–46 min	Malay	Ended
KZL	Docu-comedy drama	7 November 2018	15 episodes	19–23 min	Indonesian	Miniseries
Assalamualaikum, My Future Husband	Romantic comedy drama	6 November 2019	2 season, 23 episodes	47–50 min	Indonesian	Pending
Keluarga Baha Don	Crime comedy	11 July 2019	3 seasons, 30 episodes	21–35 min	Malay	Pending
Kopitiam: Double Shot	Sitcom	28 November 2019	1 season, 10 episodes	28–34 min	English; Malay	Pending
Star Stealer	Coming-of-age romantic comedy	30 September 2020	1 season, 10 episodes	28–36 min	Indonesian	Ended
Write Me a Love Song	Romantic musical comedy drama	25 November 2021	1 season, 10 episodes	45–63 min	Indonesian	Ended
My Coach	Romantic sports comedy drama	7 June 2022	16 episodes	44–63 min	Thai	Miniseries
She Was Pretty	Romantic workplace comedy drama	23 June 2022	16 episodes	48–59 min	Malay	Miniseries
AI.5YA	Science fiction sitcom	18 August 2022	1 season, 10 episodes	24–28 min	Malay	Pending
#lovesignal	Romantic comedy short drama	7 October 2022	1 season, 10 episodes	10–14 min	Cantonese	Pending
Ijab Kabut (I Have A Plan)	Romantic comedy drama	10 October 2022	1 season, 10 episodes	26–29 min	Malay	Pending
Real Fake	Romantic action comedy	10 October 2022	12 episodes	30–39 min	Thai	Miniseries
Bad Boys vs Crazy Girls	Teen romantic comedy	14 October 2022	1 season, 10 episodes	45–50 min	Indonesian	Renewed
K-Love	Romantic comedy drama	14 October 2022	1 season, 18 episodes	23–33 min	Filipino	Pending
Mantan tapi Menikah (Married Ex-Boyfriend)	Romantic comedy drama	31 January 2023	1 season, 10 episodes	44–66 min	Indonesian	Pending
Return Man	Romantic action comedy	8 February 2023	12 episodes	42–49 min	Thai	Miniseries
Love Me Again	Romanticworkplace comedy	23 March 2023	6 episodes	45–47 min	Thai	Miniseries
Marriage With Benefits	Romantic comedy drama	4 June 2023	1 season, 10 episodes	38–60 min	Indonesian	Pending
From Saga With Love	Romantic comedy drama	21 September 2023	1 season, 10 episodes	25–30 min	Malay	Season 1 ongoing
I Do(n't) Love Him	Romantic comedy drama	18 October 2023	1 season, 10 episodes	45 min	Indonesian	Season 1 ongoing
What's Wrong with Secretary Kim	Romantic comedy drama	18 March 2024	40 episodes	21–36 min	Filipino	Ended
How to Spot a Red Flag	Romantic comedy	25 November 2024	25 episodes	20–25 min	Filipino	Ended

==== Co-production ====
Title	Genre	Partner/Country	Premiere	Seasons	Runtime	Exclusive region(s)	Language	Status
The Bridge	Crime drama	HBO Asia	26 November 2018 (Note: Also aired on HBO & HBO Go. Previously aired on ntv7 for Season 1 (Rated P13 version))	2 seasons, 20 episodes	42–58 min	All markets	English; Malay; Indonesian (season 2)	Pending
4Freaks 4Fam	Comedy drama	Workpoint TV/Thailand	12 February 2019	1 season, 15 episodes (Note: Released in 60 4-part individual episodes, last around 8–16 min.)	~47 min	All markets	Thai	Pending
My Bubble Tea	Romantic fantasy comedy drama	AIS Play & One 31/Thailand	22 May 2020	13 episodes	44–57 min	All markets	Thai	Miniseries
Isteri Misteri	Mystery comedy	TV3/Malaysia	25 November 2020	1 season, 10 episodes	38–43 min	Southeast Asia, Hong Kong	Malay	Pending
Voice in the Rain	Romantic drama	AIS Play & Workpoint TV/Thailand	19 December 2020	16 episodes	45–47 min	All markets	Thai	Miniseries
Flower of Evil	Romantic crime thriller	ABS-CBN/Philippines	23 June 2022 (Note: Premiered within 48 hours before linear television broadcast (via Kapamilya Channel, Jeepney TV & A2Z))	32 episodes	39–49 min	All markets	Filipino	Ended
Slay	Crime drama	GMA Network/Philippines	3 March 2025	40 episodes	21–39 min	All markets	Filipino	Ended
Beauty Empire	Drama	GMA Network/Philippines	16 June 2025	44 episodes	21–38	All markets	Filipino	Ended

=== Exclusive international distribution ===
In addition to producing and distributing local titles, several Viu shows have been acquired and co-produced, partly or wholly, by Viu for exclusive first-run release or distribution (under the Viu Original label) in Southeast Asia, the Middle East and South Africa in deals with partners in other regions such as Rakuten Viki, (Note: Some of the below-listed series are either labelled as Viki Original or co-distribute with Kocowa, which handled the series distribution from three major broadcasters) Far EasTone Friday Video, KC Global Media (ONE), TV5 Network among others.

Unlike major streaming platforms, which prevent third-party linear channels from securing broadcast rights of most co-produced shows, most Viu Original-labeled titles may be screened by local television channels in their respective countries, provided that the networks' local rights for such titles are for linear television broadcast only in their respective country jurisdiction.

== Availability ==
Viu OTT video service can be accessed anytime and anywhere via Viu app at App Store for iOS devices, Google Play Store for Android devices across the region, on the Huawei App Store or visit www.viu.com to watch on the web, it also can be accessed through Apple TV devices. Registered Viu free or premium subscriber can download videos and watch offline on mobile devices such as smartphones and tablets, as well as save viewing progress, bookmark programmes and receive notifications on new episodes.

Viu operates under a premium subscription model and an ad-supported freemium model. Viu premium subscribers have access to 1080p HD quality videos and unlimited downloads without ad interruptions. Viu freemium users have access to the platform's catalog of content for free.

== Viu Shorts ==
In January 2026, Viu launched Viu Shorts as a section on Viu's mobile app. Specializing in short-form content, Viu Shorts features 1–3 minute microdrama episodes in vertical video format.

== See also ==
- PCCW
- MOOV
- ViuTV
- Vuclip
- List of streaming media services
