= Vuclip =

Mobile video on demand service

- Company type: Private
- Founded: July 2008
- Headquarters: San Jose, California, {{{location_country}}}
- No. of locations: US, Singapore, Kuala Lumpur, Mumbai, Delhi, Pune, Dubai, Jakarta
- Area served: Emerging markets
- Owner: PCCW Media
- Key people: CEO, Nickhil Jakatdar, COO and President, Arun Prakash, CTO, Bo Shen, CFO, Apurva Desai, CRO, Salman Hussain, CPO, Satheesh Kumar
- Industry: Entertainment
- Employees: 500
- Website: vuclip.com

Vuclip is a mobile video on demand (VOD) service for emerging markets with over 7 million subscribers per quarter in India, Indonesia, Malaysia, Thailand, Egypt and the United Arab Emirates. Vuclip is headquartered in Milpitas, California, and has a presence in Dubai, Beijing, Kuala Lumpur, Mumbai, Delhi, Jakarta, Bangkok, and Singapore.

== History ==
Vuclip was incorporated as a Milpitas-based mobile video search company by Nickhil Jakatdar, its founder and CEO, and Xinhui Niu in July 2008. The company raised $13 million in Series D, led by a new lead investor, Singtel Innov8. Since inception in 2008, Vuclip has attracted more than $40 million in investment from additional outfits, including the venture capital firms New Enterprise Associates and JAFCO.

In March 2015, PCCW, a Hong Kong-based Media and Entertainment Group, acquired a majority stake in the company to enable it to expand its services in the Asia Pacific region.

== Acquisitions ==
In February 2013, Vuclip made its first acquisition; the mobile video company Jigsee, to expand its own premium content inventory and app capabilities in India, one of Vuclip's biggest markets.

== Awards and recognition ==
Mobby's Award for Best New App at the Mobile Digital and Marketing Summit [2013] Smarties India Award for the publisher/media company of the year [2013] Impact's Icons of India's Digital Ecosystem.
