= Prudential BSN Takaful =

Prudential BSN Takaful Berhad
- Type: Private limited company
- Industry: Takaful
- Founded: 2006; 20 years ago
- Headquarters: Tingkat 13, Menara Prudential; Persiaran TRX Barat, 55188 Tun Razak Exchange Kuala Lumpur, Malaysia
- Key people: Rossana Annizah Ahmad Rashid (Non-Independent Non-Executive Director/Chairman); Solmaz Altin (Executive Director); Ezamshah Ismail (Independent Director); Wan Saifulrizal Wan Ismail (CEO)
- Products: Family takaful; General takaful
- Revenue: ▲RM1,088 million (2014)
- Net income: ▼RM10 million (2014)
- Total assets: ▲RM1,739 million (2014)
- Total equity: ▲RM193 million (2014)
- Parent: Bank Simpanan Nasional (51%); Prudential plc (49%)
- Website: www.prubsn.com.my

Prudential BSN Takaful Berhad (PruBSN) is a Malaysian takaful company. It was founded in 2006 and is a joint venture between Bank Simpanan Nasional and Prudential plc, who have 51 and 49 percent stakes respectively. The company is a provider of both family and general takaful.

For six successive years since 2011, PruBSN has been the Number 1 Family Takaful Operator and in 2016, our company achieved New Business Production of RM446 million with a 32.5% market share as confirmed by the industry rating agency, Insurance Services Malaysia. In 2015, it won various awards including 'Best Takaful Institution' by The Asset.

PruBSN has an agency force of more than 16,000 and partners with Standard Chartered Saadiq, Affin Islamic Bank and Lembaga Pembiayaan Perumahan Sektor Awam (previously known as Bahagian Pinjaman Perumahan, BPP) to distribute their products. In 2013, it began advancing the use of mobile point-of-sales to sell products instantly through debit or credit cards. As of April 2015, more than 50 percent of sales were conducted on the mobile platform.

== History ==
Prudential BSN Takaful Berhad (PruBSN) was established in 2006 as a joint venture between British financial services company Prudential plc and Malaysian government-owned savings institution Bank Simpanan Nasional (BSN). The company was formed to provide takaful products, which are based on the principles of Islamic finance, including mutual assistance and shared responsibility.

The joint venture was officially launched in Kuala Lumpur on 8 August 2006, following approval from Bank Negara Malaysia, the country's central bank. Under the original ownership structure, BSN held a 51% stake in the company, while Prudential Corporation Holdings Limited, a subsidiary of Prudential plc, held the remaining 49%.

PruBSN was established during a period of development in Malaysia's Islamic financial services industry, as the country sought to expand the range of Shariah-compliant financial products available to consumers. The company initially focused on providing takaful savings, protection and investment products designed for the Malaysian market.

Since its establishment, PruBSN has developed its family takaful business to offer Shariah-compliant financial protection and savings solutions for individuals and families in Malaysia.
