= Park Avenue Tower =

Skyscraper in Manhattan, New York

Park Avenue Tower 65 East 55th Street
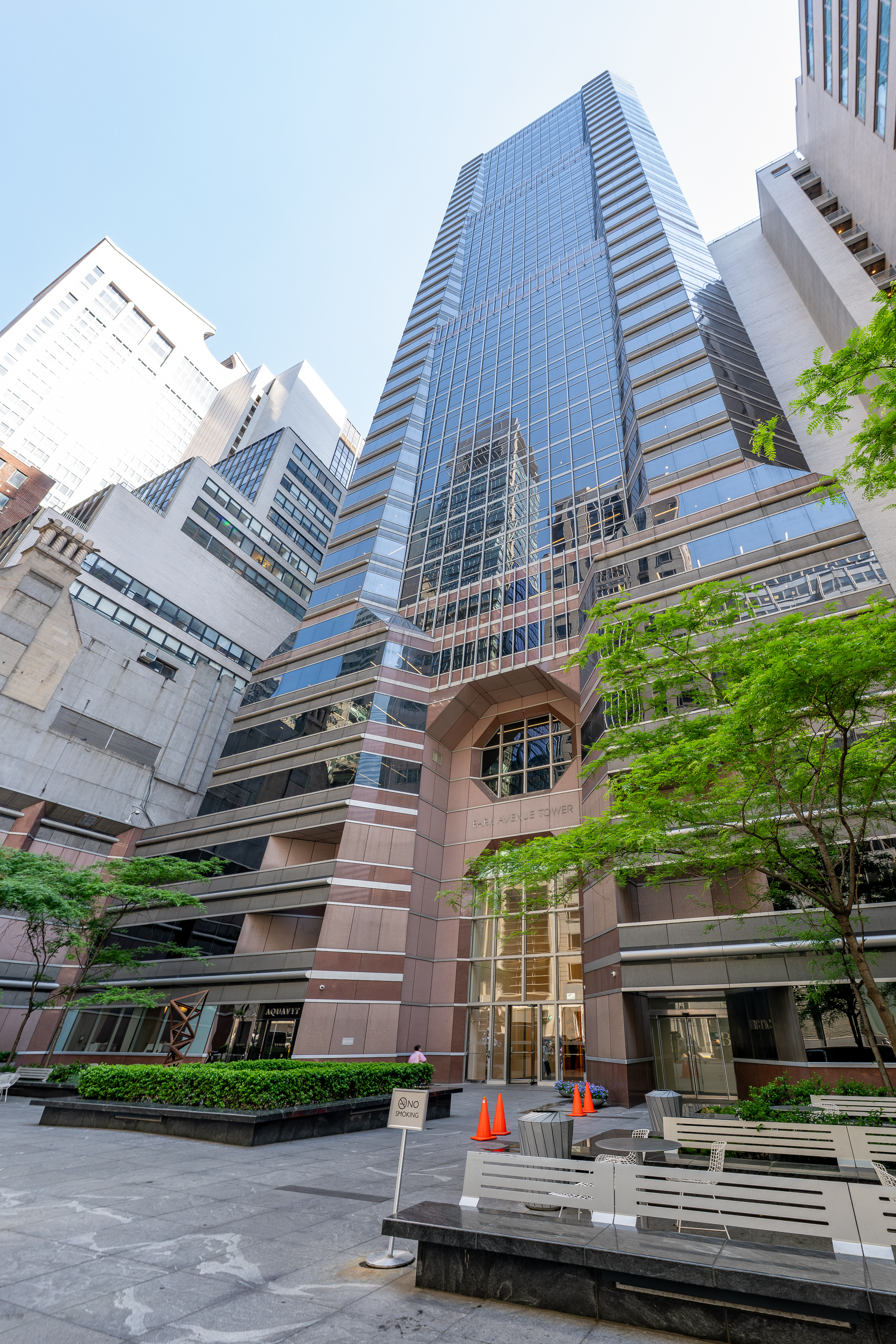
- Interactive map of the Park Avenue Tower; 65 East 55th Street area

General information
- Status: Opened
- Location: Midtown Manhattan, New York City
- Coordinates: 40°45′39″N 73°58′19″W
- Completed: 1986
- Owner: Blackstone Group

Height
- Architectural: 561 ft (171 m)

Technical details
- Floor count: 36
- Floor area: 592,000 sq ft (55,000 m^{2})

Design and construction
- Architect: Murphy/Jahn Architects
- Developer: Park Tower Realty

Park Avenue Tower (also 65 East 55th Street) is a building on Park Avenue, between 55th Street and 56th Street, in Midtown Manhattan, New York City. The office building developed by Park Tower Realty opened in 1986 and has a height of 561 feet (171 metres). Park Avenue Tower has 36 floors, which can be reached with seventeen elevators. Designed by Murphy/Jahn Architects in postmodern style, Park Avenue Tower is made of stone, steel and glass. The floor plan of the building is a square with flattened corners and the tower narrows as it increases in height. There is a pyramid-shaped structure on the roof of the building that is not visible from the street.

In front of the Park Avenue Tower main entrance on 55th Street is a Privately Owned Public Space with six polished granite planters. The building can be accessed through four entrances, one on 56th Street and three on 55th Street. The entrance on 56th Street and the middle entrance on 55th Street lead to the multi-story lobby. The walls of the lobby are made of granite and marble. The east entrance on 55th Street used to lead to the office of law firm Paul Hastings, which had an area of 23,500 m^{2} (252,951.9 sq ft) and was spread over sixteen floors, though Paul Hastings has since relocated to the MetLife Building. The fourth entrance leads to Restaurant Aquavit, a restaurant with two Michelin stars.

== Site ==
Park Avenue Tower is located in Midtown Manhattan on the west side of Park Avenue between 55th Street and 56th Street. The building is close to four New York City Subway stations in the immediate area: Fifth Avenue-59th Street (serving the N, R, and W trains), 57th Street (F and M trains), Fifth Avenue/53rd Street (E, F, and <F> trains), and Lexington Avenue/59th Street (4, 5, 6, <6>, N, R, and W trains).

Park Avenue Tower borders three buildings, namely the Café Cosí in the northwest, the New York Friars Club in the southwest and 430 Park Avenue in the east. On the other side of 56th Street is 432 Park Avenue, while on the other side of 55th Street are Park Avenue Place, the Heron Tower and 410 Park Avenue. In addition, 550 Madison Avenue is to the west and 590 Madison Avenue is to the northwest.

== History ==
In 2007, Macklowe Properties bought the Park Avenue Tower along with five other buildings in New York for $7 billion from the Blackstone Group, which had acquired the building by acquiring Equity Office Properties, the previous owner. One year later, in the summer of 2008, the building, along with the 21-story 850 Third Avenue, was sold to Shorenstein Properties for $930 million, as Macklowe Properties faced challenges during the credit crisis. At the end of 2013, it was announced that Grocon wanted to buy the Park Avenue Tower for $500 million, which later became $775 million. In the spring of 2014, that deal was canceled when Grocon could not raise sufficient funding. Grocon had secured a $530 million loan from Jones Lang LaSalle, but could not obtain further funding. In July 2014, the building was sold again to Blackstone Group for $750 million. Blackstone resold it to SL Green in October 2025 for $730 million.
