= CASBAA =

Asian trade association

AVIA
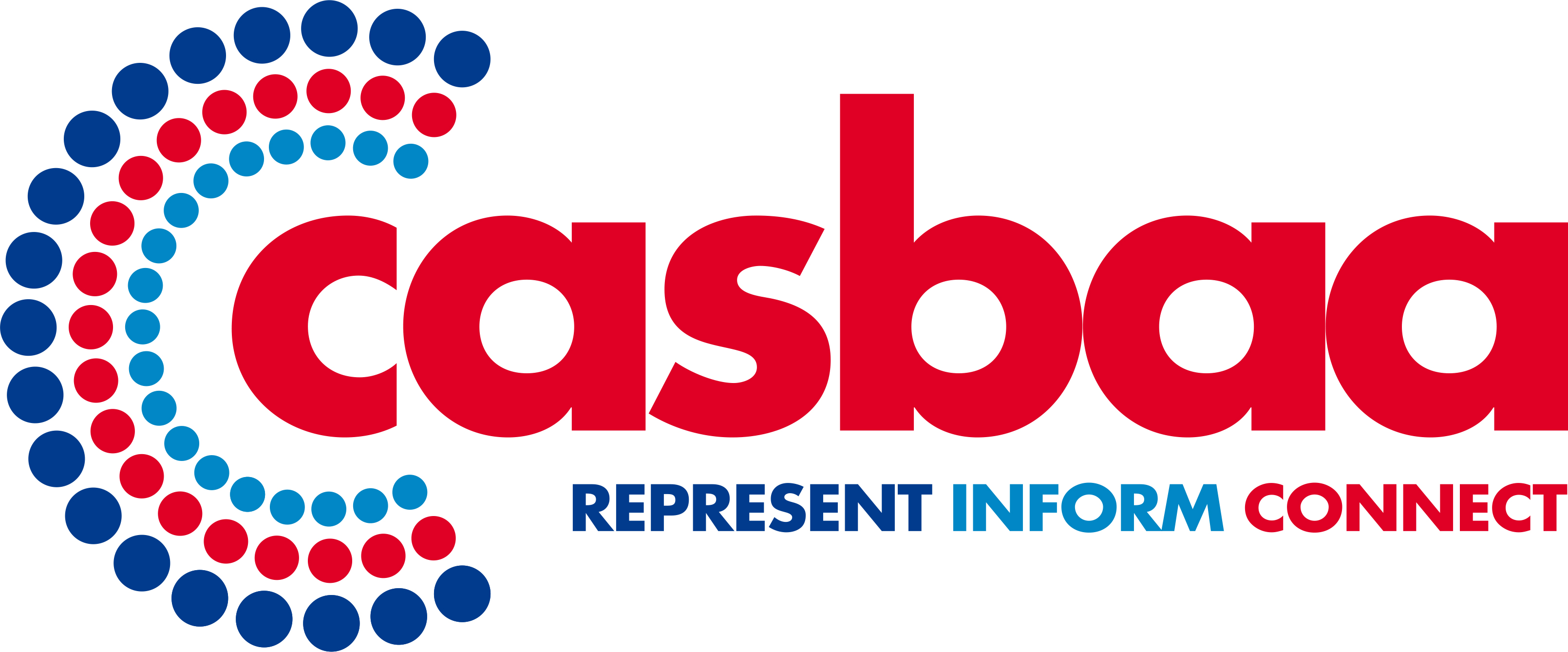
- Formation: 1991
- Type: Broadcasting Association
- Location: Hong Kong
- Members: 130 member companies
- Official language: English
- CEO: Christopher Slaughter
- Website: www.avia.org

The Asia Video Industry Association (AVIA) previously known as Cable and Satellite Broadcasting Association of Asia (CASBAA), is a trade association for multichannel TV broadcast service providers in Asia. Established in 1991, AVIA now includes digital multichannel television, content, platforms, advertising and video delivery.

AVIA's 130 member organisations include leading cable, satellite, DTH and broadband operators as well as multinational networks and programmers in Asia and worldwide. Member corporations also comprise leading suppliers and manufacturers of broadcast technology, related business service providers, communications, advertising & marketing agencies, media, government regulatory bodies, telecom companies, new media service providers and network enablers.

== Descriptions ==
AVIA works to enhance copyright enforcement, promotion of multichannel TV, promotion of regional technical standards, regulatory roundtables and educational seminars of the business environment for traditional, electronic media, and telecom companies.

AVIA develops and publishes research and reports on key markets, share news and trends, and communicates with the media and general public.

== Governance ==
AVIA is led by a Council of Governors. The Council is composed of non-elected Governors who are representatives of Patron member companies, and elected Governors from member companies. These members then elect the Association Chairman and a Board of Directors for a two-year term, which is directly responsible for the management of AVIA in concert with the CEO.

== Publications and Reports ==
In addition to weekly and monthly newsletters highlighting industry news, media releases, events and jobs, AVIA regularly publishes reports and papers. AVIA also produces Connections magazine biannually for members with updates, information and other news. On occasion, AVIA also work with members to post their research and data.

== Representation ==
Policy and Regulatory issues are among the highest priorities for AVIA. The Association undertakes numerous initiatives to advocate on behalf of the pay TV industry in the Asia-Pacific region, including pursuit of copyright enforcement, promotion of best practices for governments, lobbying and information activities, regulatory roundtables and educational seminars.

== AVIA Committees ==
AVIA committees play a key role in establishing the priorities and initiatives of the Association and of the sectors that AVIA represents. Representatives of Member companies are encouraged to join relevant committees. A Director of the Board oversees each committee's activities and liaises directly with its Chairs.

Currently, AVIA offers seven committees:

- CASBAA 2020 Committee
- CASBAA Advertising & Research Committee
- CASBAA OTT & Connected Media Group
- CASBAA Regulatory & Anti-Piracy Committee
- CASBAA Satellite Industry Committee
- CASBAA Technology Advisory Group
- CASBAA Operator's Group
- CASBAA Wireless Action Group

== AVIA Convention ==
The AVIA annual convention is a yearly industry gathering attended by operators, content provider, satellite services, technology companies, carries, and advertising agencies from the Asia-Pacific region and internationally. The event features keynote addresses, panel discussions, and networking sessions.

Recent Conventions:

- CASBAA Convention 2007
- CASBAA Convention 2008 - All Eyes are On Asia
- CASBAA Convention 2009
- CASBAA Convention 2010 - Unlock Your Networks
- CASBAA Convention 2011 - TV365
- CASBAA Convention 2012 - 18 Reasons Why
- CASBAA Convention 2013 - Change is ON THE AIR
- CASBAA Convention 2014 - Beyond the Box (Oct 27-30, 2014, Hong Kong)
- CASBAA Convention 2015 - Making Waves (Oct 26-28, 2015, Hong Kong)
