= PCCW =

Hong Kong multinational telecommunications services company

PCCW Ltd.

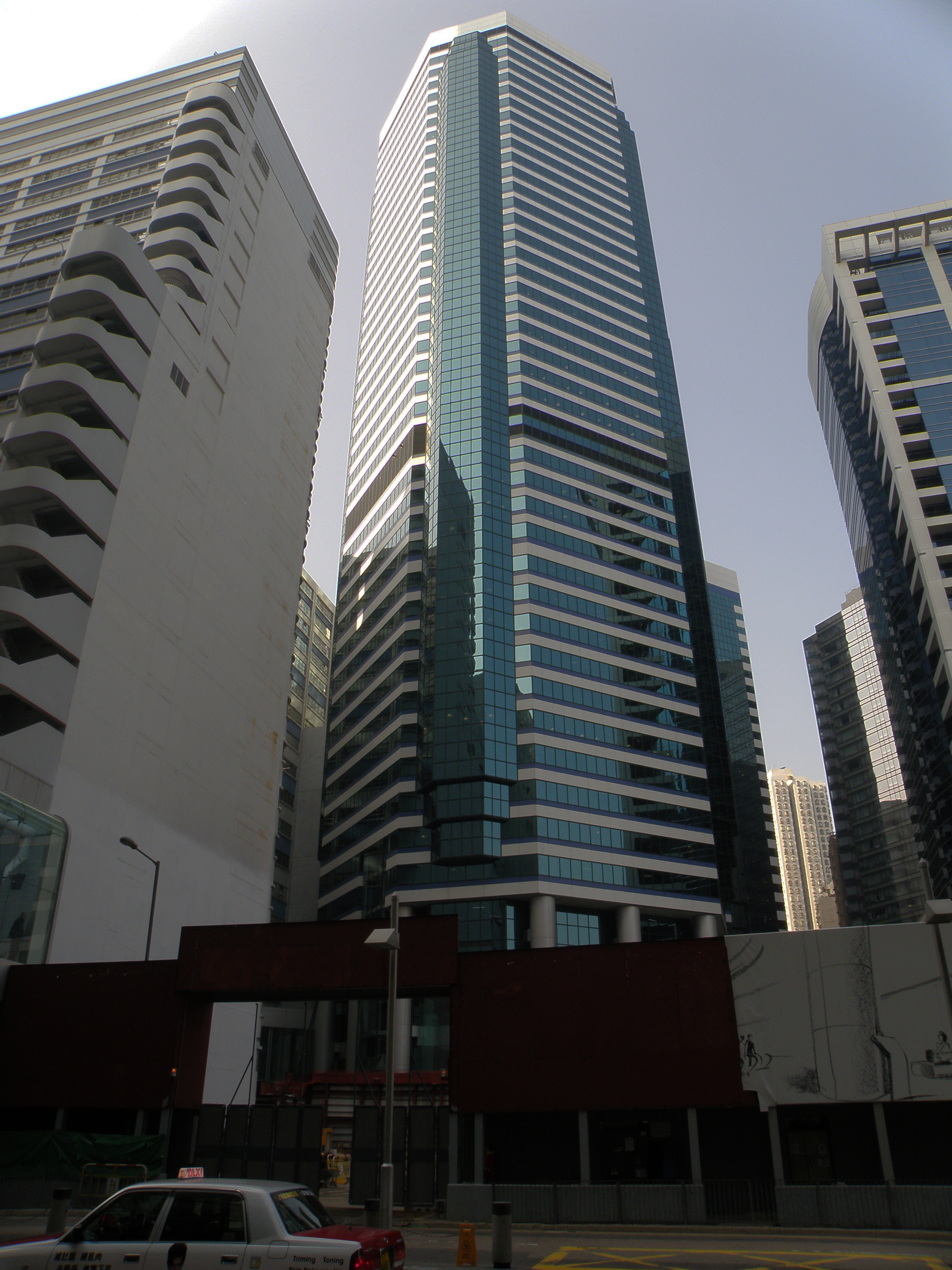
- Headquarters at PCCW Tower in Taikoo Place
- Formerly: Pacific Century CyberWorks Limited
- Type: Public
- Traded as: SEHK: 8
- Industry: Telecommunications
- Founded: 24 August 2000; 26 years ago
- Headquarters: Hong Kong
- Key people: Richard Li (Chairman); Susanna Hui (Acting Group Managing Director and Group Chief Financial Officer)
- Products: Fixed-line, Broadband Internet access, IPTV, Mobile, IT Solutions, Data Centers, Contact Centers, Integrated Global Communications, Infrastructure, Advertising and Interactive Services
- Revenue: ▲HK$40.252 billion (2025)
- Operating income: ▲HK$3.423 billion (2025)
- Net income: ▲HK$2.615 billion (2025)
- Total assets: ▲HK$105.409 billion (2025)
- Total equity: ▼HK$6.806 billion (2025)
- Owner: Pacific Century Group (30.99％); China Unicom (18.43％)
- Number of employees: 14,600 (2025)

Chinese name
- Traditional Chinese: 電訊盈科有限公司
- Simplified Chinese: 电讯盈科有限公司
Transcriptions
Standard Mandarin
- Hanyu Pinyin: Diànxùn Yíngkē Yǒuxiàn Gōngsī
Yue: Cantonese
- Jyutping: Din6 seon3 jing4 fo1 jau5 haan6 gung1 si1

Alternative Chinese name
- Traditional Chinese: 電訊盈科
- Simplified Chinese: 电讯盈科
Transcriptions
Standard Mandarin
- Hanyu Pinyin: Diànxùn yíngkē
Yue: Cantonese
- Jyutping: Din6 seon3 jing4 fo1

Second alternative Chinese name
- Traditional Chinese: 電盈
- Simplified Chinese: 电盈
Transcriptions
Standard Mandarin
- Hanyu Pinyin: Diàn Yíng
Yue: Cantonese
- Jyutping: Din6 jing4
- ASN: 3491
- Traffic Levels: 1Tbps+
- Website: www.pccw.com

PCCW Limited (formerly known as Pacific Century CyberWorks Limited) is a Hong Kong–based information and communication technology (ICT) and telecommunications company.

The Company holds a majority stake in the HKT Trust and HKT Limited, and also holds a stake in Pacific Century Premium Developments Limited.

PCCW is headquartered in Hong Kong and operates in Europe, the Middle East, Africa, the Americas, mainland China, and other parts of Asia.

== Main business ==
=== HKT Limited ===
==== Brands and services ====
- Netvigator
- CSL Mobile ("csl", "1O1O" and "Club SIM")
- Sun Mobile (majority stake)
- PPS (Payment by Phone Service) – a bill payment service provided by HKT and EPS.
- The Club – a Hong Kong customer loyalty programme.
- HKT Teleservices – formerly PCCW Teleservices, a contact center and business process outsourcing provider
- HKT Payment Limited – the developer of "Tap & Go", a prepaid mobile payment service for Hong Kong users.
- HKT-eye – over-the-top media services and Internet Protocol TV service delivered to firmware-modified tablet computer
- PCCW Global
  - Console Connect
  - Crypteia Networks

===== HKT Interactive Media/(Now TV/MOOV) =====
Moov is a lossless music digital streaming service based in Hong Kong. It provides music content, including songs, concert videos, MVs, and other music shows, under a monthly fee.

Former service

- iTV, an interactive television

=== Viu ===
Viu, PCCW’s leading pan-regional Over-the-top (OTT) video streaming service, is available in markets across Southeast Asia, the Middle East and South Africa.

=== ViuTV ===
ViuTV and ViuTVsix are a general entertainment television channels in Hong Kong operated by HK Television Entertainment (HKTVE). The channel serves as a free-to-air outlet for television programmes shown on the channels operated by Now TV. In 2015, HK Television Entertainment was granted a 12-year free-to-air television broadcast license by the Hong Kong Government.

=== PCCW Solutions ===
Lenovo PCCW Solutions Limited
- Formerly: Unihub
- Type: Limited company
- Industry: Information Technology
- Founded: 15 August 2022
- Headquarters: Hong Kong, China
- Key people: Jerry Li, Chief Executive Officer (Departed in November 2024)
- Owner: Lenovo (84%) and PCCW (16%)
- Website: www.lpstech.com

PCCW Solutions is the information technology services and business process outsourcing (BPO) division of PCCW. Press releases prior to February 2006 refer to PCCW Solutions by the name Unihub. Unihub was a re-branding of PCCW's Business eSolutions division, from 1 September 2003.

Business eSolutions division formed a venture with China Telecom to provide IT solutions to major business organisations in 2002. This was in addition to PCCW's PCITC alliance with Sinopec, formed to serve Sinopec plus other players in China's petrochemical sector. The division also contributed to the new Hong Kong Identity Card system in 2003.

In early 2003, Business eSolutions entered a contract to provide services for Bank of China's credit card back office processing system in China. It also extended a 2002 enterprise resource planning (ERP) project into more provinces for China Mobile and completed the flight information display system (FIDS) for Xiamen Airport, and a human resource management and financial management system for the Hong Kong Council of Social Service.

In 2022, PCCW announced a strategic partnership with Lenovo Group by selling part of the shares of its two subsidiaries engaged in the ITS business. Lenovo PCCW Solutions Limited (LPS) was established.

Lenovo becomes an effective 84% shareholder in Lenovo PCCW Technology Solutions (PLTS) via a direct 80% interest in PLTS and a 20% stake in PCCW Network Services, the holding company of PCCW's remaining IT solutions obligations in Hong Kong. LPS will focus on expanding its activities across Asia, including Hong Kong, Macau, mainland China, Singapore, and the Philippines.

Lenovo and PCCW believe it represents over $300B in addressable IT Services market opportunity.

=== Pacific Century Premium Developments ===
Majority-owned by PCCW, Pacific Century Premium Developments ("PCPD", SEHK: 432) develops and manages property and infrastructure projects, as well as investments in buildings in the Asia-Pacific region. PCCW acquired a majority stake in Dong Fang Gas Co. Ltd through a back door listing in 2004, injecting the development rights to the Cyberport project, which includes the Bel-Air residential development, and renamed it Pacific Century Premium Developments.

Apart from the Bel-Air residential development, PCPD holds, jointly with PCCW, the right of first refusal to redevelop 60 PCCW-owned telephone exchange buildings into residential and commercial properties.

== Past subsidiaries ==
=== UK Broadband ===
The UK Broadband Group (shortened to UKBG for marketing) is a wholly owned subsidiary and upstream service provider. Its UK business has been a failure. In June 2014, UKBG launched a 4G service in central London. In February 2017, PCCW agreed to sell UKBG to Mobile operator Three.

== Corporate history ==
The legal person of PCCW Limited was incorporated as "Ring Holdings Limited" (Chinese: 群山企業有限公司) on 24 April 1979. It was renamed several times and known as Tricom Holdings Limited (Chinese: 得信佳集團有限公司) in 1992. In October 1994, Tricom Holdings became a listed company. In May 1999 Richard Li acquired the company, and as a backdoor listing, the listed company was renamed to Pacific Century Cyberworks Limited (Chinese: 盈科數碼動力有限公司; abb. PCCW) in the same year.

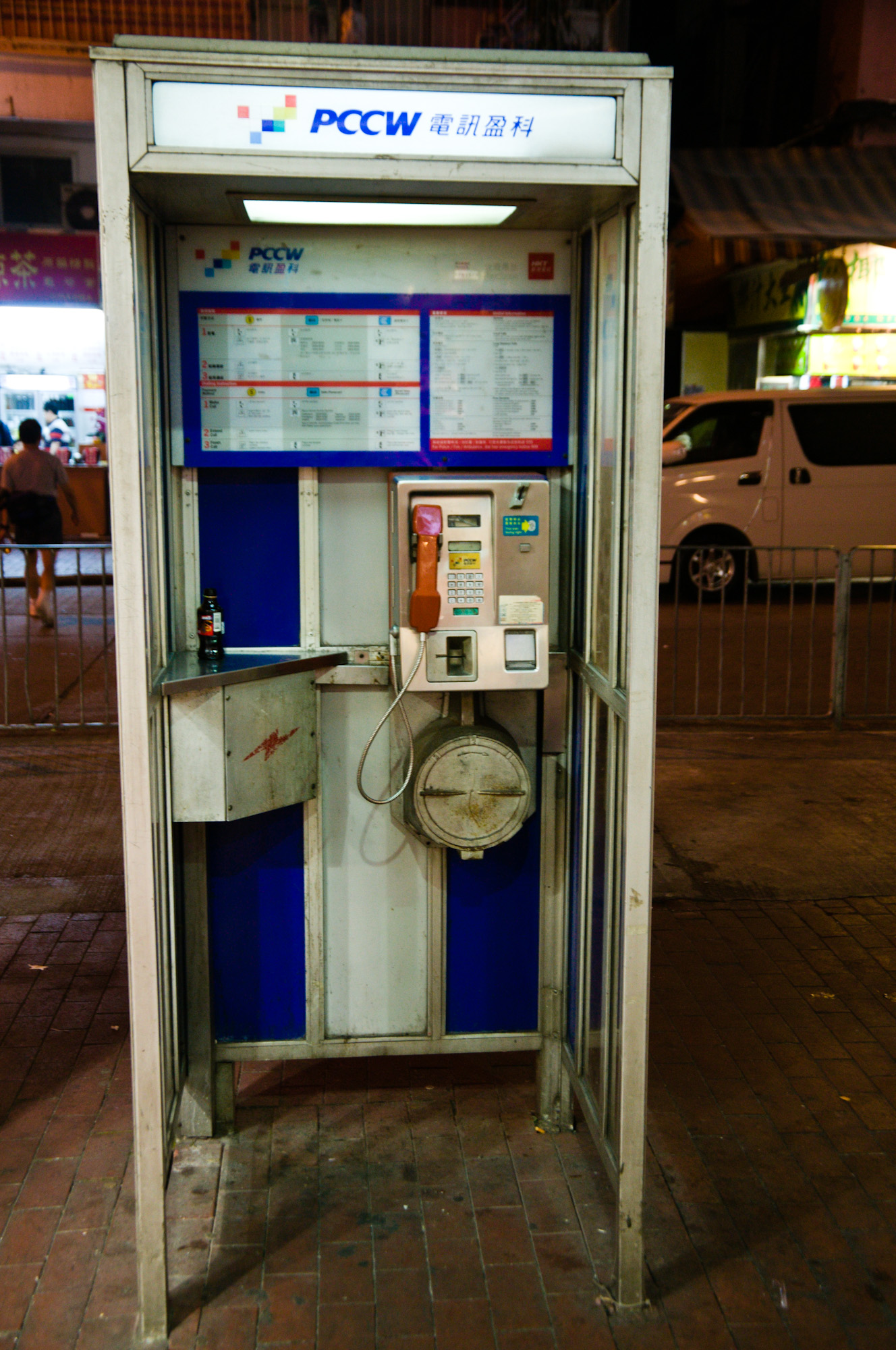
A PCCW Payphone in Hong Kong, 2012.

In March 1999, Richard Li's private company Pacific Century Group won a controversial land deal, acquiring valuable waterfront real estate from the government without any public auction bids. The Hong Kong government, under chief executive Tung Chee Hwa, gave away the land to his new high-tech residential and commercial venture called Cyberport. The development of Cyberport was later injected to Pacific Century Cyberworks Limited (Chinese: 盈科數碼動力有限公司; abb. PCCW), a new company formed in May 1999 via a backdoor listing.

The stock of Pacific Century CyberWorks rose from HK$6.00 to HK$19.50 between 1 and 28 December 1999. 23 Dec is a Heritage of Pacific Century CyberWorks, breaking the record of a single company in Hong Kong history with a HK$5 billion transaction. Pacific Century CyberWorks became the seventh-listed (value over HK$170 billion) company on the Hong Kong Exchange on 28 December 1999.

PCCW acquired Hong Kong Telecom (HKT) in August 2000, which was formerly known as the "Hong Kong Telephone Company" (founded in 1925). Initially, HKT owner Cable & Wireless entertained a bid from Singapore Telecommunications, but there was Beijing concern about a Singapore company owning the largest Hong Kong telephone system. PCCW entered the scene and offered Cable and Wireless PCCW stock and US$11 billion in bank loans by HSBC, Bank of China, BNP Paribas and Barclays. The acquisition vaulted PCCW from a dot-com holdings company to one of the largest universal corporations in Hong Kong. PCCW was now also the leading Internet service provider in Hong Kong, using the Netvigator brand for dial-up modem and DSL service. PCCW was the object of much scorn in Hong Kong as a result of the HKT purchase. In 2003, the company's stock price was down 96 percent from its 2000 peak. In the face of challenges due to debt, intense local telecoms competition and a struggling international joint venture Reach (50/50 owned by PCCW and Telstra), PCCW was the worst-performing blue chip on the Hong Kong Stock Exchange (HKSE) in 2002 and 2003. Stock price came down from HK$129.25 to HK$4.7 in less than three years.

In 2003, Cable and Wireless finished cashing in all the stock from the 14.7 percent stake it had in PCCW. Worth US$5 billion at the time of the 2000 acquisition of HKT, the stock sales yielded only $1.9 billion in the end.

Richard Li resigned as PCCW's Chief Executive Officer in June 2003 but remained Chairman and Executive Director. Jack So, who left his Chairman position at Hong Kong subway operator MTR Corporation Limited, took up the job of Deputy Chairman and Group Managing Director at PCCW on 25 July 2003.

George Chan resigned as a Group Managing Director and Executive Director in 2014. Former Infosys president B.G. Srinivas was announced as the Group's Managing Director, effective July 2014.

After several years as a wholly owned subsidiary, PCCW floated HKT again in 2011.

=== FBI surveillance ===
According to a FCC document, undersea cabling company Reach – a joint venture of Telstra (then 50.1 percent-owned by the Australian Government) and PCCW, a Hong Kong corporation – had to send all communications to or from US to a storage facility "physically located in the United States, from which Electronic Surveillance can be conducted pursuant to Lawful US Process." The document also specifies the facility should be run exclusively by US FBI staff.

=== Attempted privatisation ===
Although PCCW's substantial shareholder China Netcom had earlier expressed objection to any disposal of key assets to foreign groups, it also refused to increase its stake; Richard Li attempted to exit from the business in 2006. PCCW confirmed that Australia's Macquarie Bank and private equity firm Texas Pacific/Newbridge, had submitted expressions of interest to acquire PCCW's core telecom and media assets.

PCCW chairman Richard Li agreed to sell his indirectly held 22.66 percent stake in PCCW on 11 July 2006 to Fiorlatte Ltd, a new startup company wholly owned by Francis Leung Pak-to, for a total consideration of HK$9.16 billion. In turn, Francis Leung Pak-to agreed to sell an 8% stake in PCCW to Telefónica for 323 million euros. Leung, former Peregrine investment banker, is closely associated with Li Ka-shing. PCCW's stock, which had joined Hang Seng Index (HSI) index on 9 August 2000, ceased to be a HSI constituent, effective 10 June 2008.

=== Purported Cable & Wireless takeover bid ===
News report from the Sunday Times on 6 February 2003 revealed that PCCW made a preliminary takeover approach to Cable & Wireless in December 2002 as the British company's share languished near record lows.

Li told the Sunday Times newspaper that PCCW would not launch a hostile bid for C&W but that the two companies could work together to enhance shareholders' value.

The Times quoted Li as saying that he was planning to try again that week with a two billion pound (US$3.27 billion) bid for C&W. Following the news report, PCCW issued a statement through the Hong Kong stock exchange on 6 February 2003 morning saying it had not made a formal offer for C&W and was not in takeover talks with the company. Later in the day, in London and Hong Kong, PCCW issued statements saying it had made a preliminary takeover approach to C&W in a letter at the end of 2002.

PCCW apologised on 10 February 2003 for making what some in the market see as contradictory statements. The Hong Kong Stock Exchange demanded an explanation from PCCW after noting discrepancies between the two statements regarding its approach to C&W about a possible bid.

In any case, C&W had rebuffed PCCW's takeover approach by February 2003.

=== Privatisation plan ===
In a heated shareholders meeting held on 4 February 2009, which lasted seven and a half hours, the shareholders approved the PCCW plan allowing its majority shareholders to force out all minority shareholders of the company amidst allegations of vote-buying. Privatisation would allow PCCW to be delisted from Hong Kong Stock Exchange, while its parent would remain listed in Singapore.

Governance activist David Webb alerted the authorities to allegations that hundreds of agents at Fortis Insurance Co. (Asia), once part of PCCW, may have been given board lots of 1,000 PCCW shares. The Securities and Futures Commission found that Francis Yuen, a Li associate, and member of the buyout group, had instructed a senior executive at Fortis to distribute PCCW shares to about 500 Fortis agents. Yuen and Fortis Asia regional director, Inneo Lam, had exchanged telephone calls shortly before Lam ordered half a million PCCW shares that were later split into board lots and given away to his staff; Lam's secretary had asked for, and received, share transfer forms from Yuen's secretary. Majority shareholders gained approval from the High Court to proceed with their US$2.2 billion privatisation, but the Appeals Court unanimously overturned the ruling.

== See also ==
- Jaleco, former subsidiary
