= Pacific Century Group =

Asia-based private investment group

- Type: Private
- Industry: Financial; Telecommunications; Property investment
- Founded: October 1993; 33 years ago
- Founder: Richard Li
- Headquarters: Hong Kong
- Subsidiaries: PCCW; FWD Group; Bolttech
- Website: www.pcg-group.com

Pacific Century Group (PCG), chaired by Richard Li, is an Asia-based private investment group founded in 1993 with interests in technology, media and telecommunications, financial services, infrastructure, property and other investments. It operates mainly in the Asia-Pacific region, including Singapore, Hong Kong and Japan.

PCG's main subsidiary is PCCW, which is the largest telecommunications and IT provider in Hong Kong, and through which it controls Hong Kong Telecom (HKT) and Pacific Century Premium Developments among other companies.

== Background ==
Richard Li first became interested in the TMT space in 1989 when he foresaw the opportunity for the creative development of information and home entertainment services in Asia and set-up STAR TV, Asia's first satellite-delivered cable-TV service. By 1993 STAR TV had a viewer base of 45 million. In 1993, Richard Li sold STAR TV to Rupert Murdoch's News Corporation in 2 tranches for around US$1.0 billion, achieving a return of 9x over 3 years, and went on to form PCG.

== Acquisitions ==
=== First Acquisition ===
PCG has a strong track record of holding and developing assets over the long term, and has a network of well-established connections in Asia. Its first foray into financial services came from the acquisition of Pacific Century Insurance ("PCI") in 1994. PCI was listed on the stock exchange of Hong Kong in 1999. By 2007, PCI was the sixth largest life insurer in Hong Kong, including PCI Investment Management Between 2000 and 2007 this company's assets increased seven-fold and the firm received numerous awards from Standard & Poor's, as well as Lipper. Having grown the business in Hong Kong into a public company with a strong agency force and sound financial performance, there were limited opportunities for expansion in Asia at that time. In 2007, PCI was sold to Fortis to better position the business for the next phase of growth as part of a broader international platform.

=== Subsequent Acquisitions ===
PCG acquired AIG's asset management operations, AIG Investments, in 2010, and renamed it PineBridge Investments after restructuring. In December 2024, it was sold to Metlife.

In February 2013, PCG announced the acquisition of the Hong Kong, Macau and Thailand insurance businesses from ING Groep N.V. (ING). PCG has said that these acquisitions are the first step in its plan to develop a world class pan-Asian insurance business to capitalise on the long-term potential of the insurance sector. The total cash consideration of the acquisition was US$2.14 billion (EUR 1.64 billion).

In September 2020, FWD Group, the insurance arm of Pacific Century Group entered into a strategic partnership with IPP Financial Advisers to develop life insurance products.

== Brands ==
=== Current Subsidiaries and Investments ===
- Bolttech
- FWD Group
- PCCW
  - Hong Kong Telecom
  - Mox Bank (15% owned by PCCW; 10% owned by HKT)
  - Pacific Century Premium Developments
  - PCCW Media
    - HK Television Entertainment
      - ViuTV
      - ViuTVsix
  - PCCW Solutions

=== Former Subsidiaries and Investments ===
- Pacific Century Insurance – sold in 2007 (renamed FTLife Insurance Company)
- PineBridge Investments – sold in 2024 to MetLife
