= Timeline of reactions to the 2020 Hong Kong national security law (January 2021) =

December events of the 2019-2020 pro-democracy demonstrations in Hong Kong

Timeline of the 2019–2020 Hong Kong protests
| 2019 | | | March–June | | | | July | August | September | October | November | December |
| 2020 | January | February | March | April | May | June | July | August | September | October | November | December |
| 2021 | January | February | March | April | May | June | July | August | September–November | | | December |

A dramatic manifestation of the far reach of the Hong Kong national security law was the mass arrest of 54 pro-democracy activists on 6 January. The arrested stood accused of subverting state power, a crime under the national security law, for their participation as candidates or in other capacities, in the 2020 Hong Kong pro-democracy primaries, which was part of a plan to increase pressure in parliament for democratic reform. Most of them were released on bail the following day. For the first time, the National Security Department of the police cited the national security law to block the website of HKChronicles. There were also several convictions in relation to the 2019-2020 Hong Kong protests.

== 1 January ==
=== New Year's protests largely suppressed, CHRF single-van protest ===
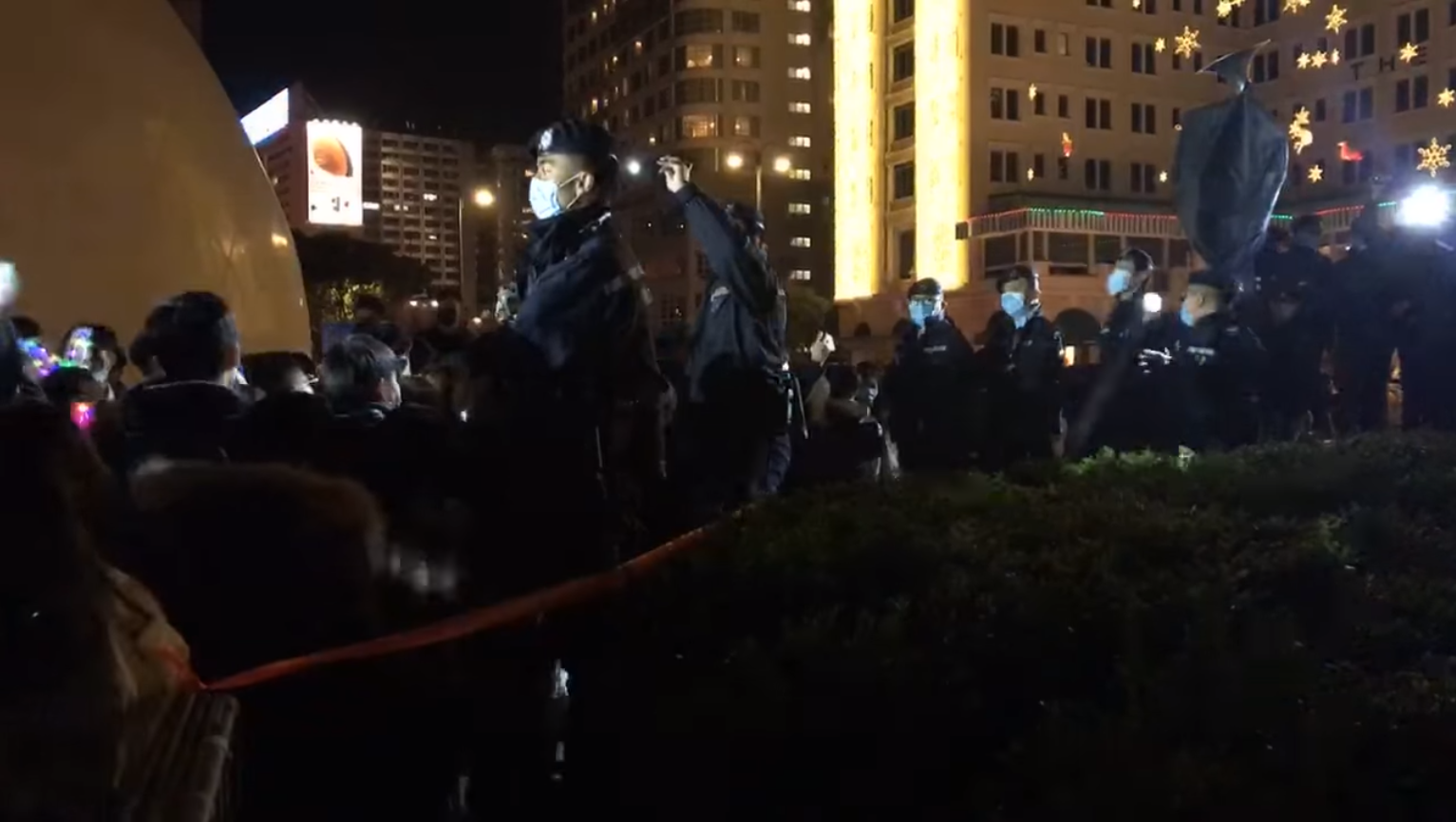
A number of police officers suddenly rushed to the leaving crowd, and raised their flashlights after someone chanted Liberate Hong Kong

The day marked the first time in ten years that the Hong Kong new year marches did not take place. Police was out in force to prevent illegal protests. A van with Sam Yip, Lee Cheuk-yan and Figo Chan, from which banners were hanging which read "Free all political prisoners", was traveling from a reception centre for detainees in Lai Chi Kok, where Chan shouting the foregoing slogan, to Tsim Sha Tsui and then on to the Legislative Council Complex in Admiralty. Chan said that police had told the trio in advance of the protest that the mobile mini-demonstration was acceptable, as the ban on gatherings did not cover vehicles. Later, however, they asked them to tone down the speaker, and according to Chan, were accused repeatedly of violating the ban and social-distancing rules.

The police deployed tight defenses on the waterfront of Tsim Sha Tsui and used video cameras to photograph the gathering of citizens, urging them not to violate the gathering restriction order. During the countdown and as they were leaving, some people chanted Liberate Hong Kong, revolution of our times and ill wishes for the police officers and their families. Near the Hong Kong Cultural Centre, a number of police officers suddenly rushed to the leaving crowd and raised their flashlights. No one was arrested.

== 5 January ==
=== Chief Justice Geoffrey Ma speaking to reporters before retiring ===
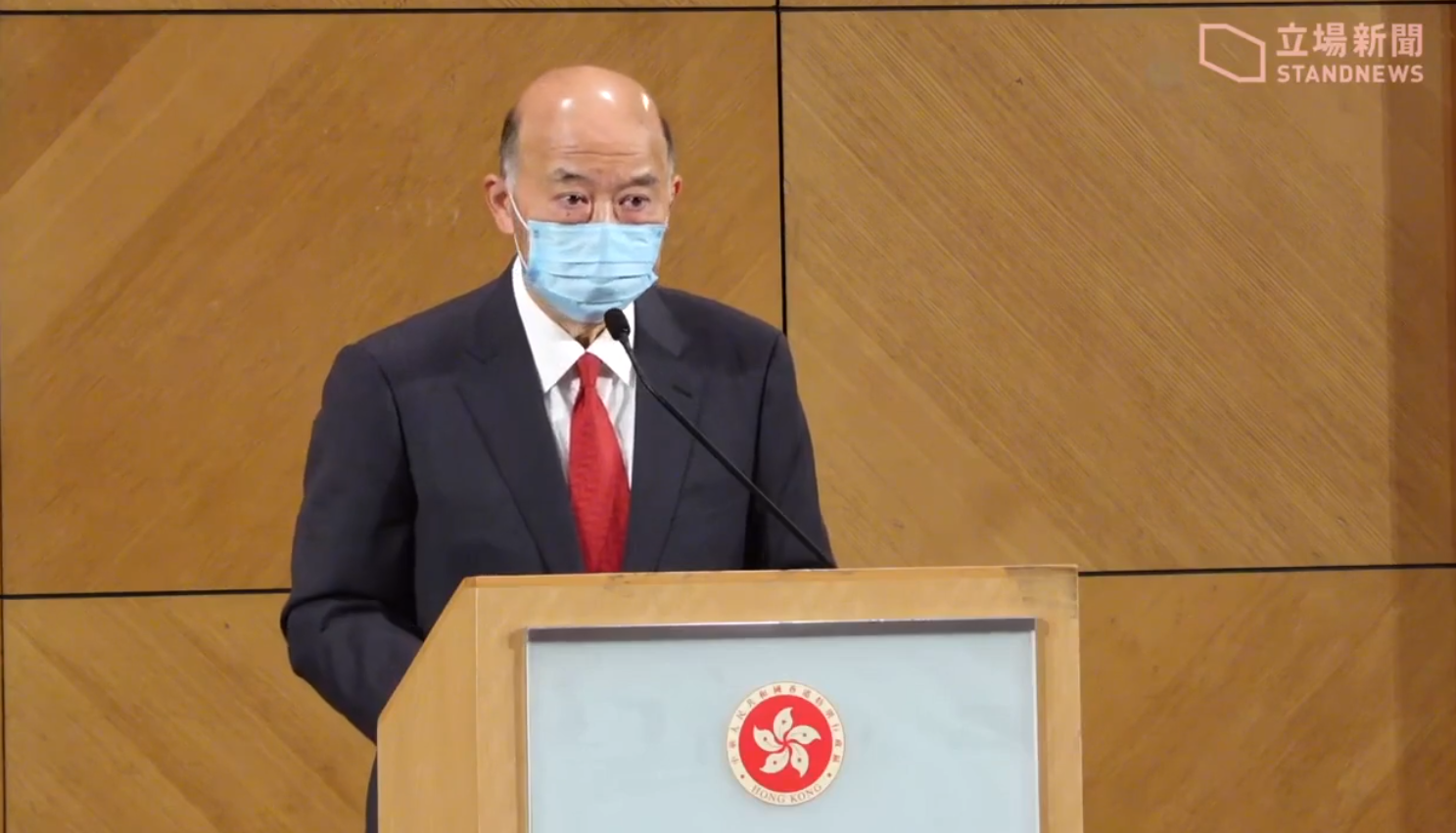
Outgoing Chief Justice Geoffrey Ma speaking to the media

Chief Justice of the Court of Final Appeal, Geoffrey Ma, met with reporters before retiring after ten years of service. Regarding calls for reforms which had come from the Chinese central government, Ma said that the judiciary would consider these if details were given. In an indirect reference to some court rulings which had caused dissatisfaction by those calling for reforms, he said that "it is not particularly satisfactory to call for reform on the basis of a result one does not like". Asked whether Hong Kong dissidents would still enjoy legal protection under local laws, given the provision in the Hong Kong national security law to extradite to the mainland, Ma said that there "was no straight answer", but that the courts would do their best to protect residents.

== 6 January ==
=== 54 pro-democracy activists arrested for holding primary elections ===
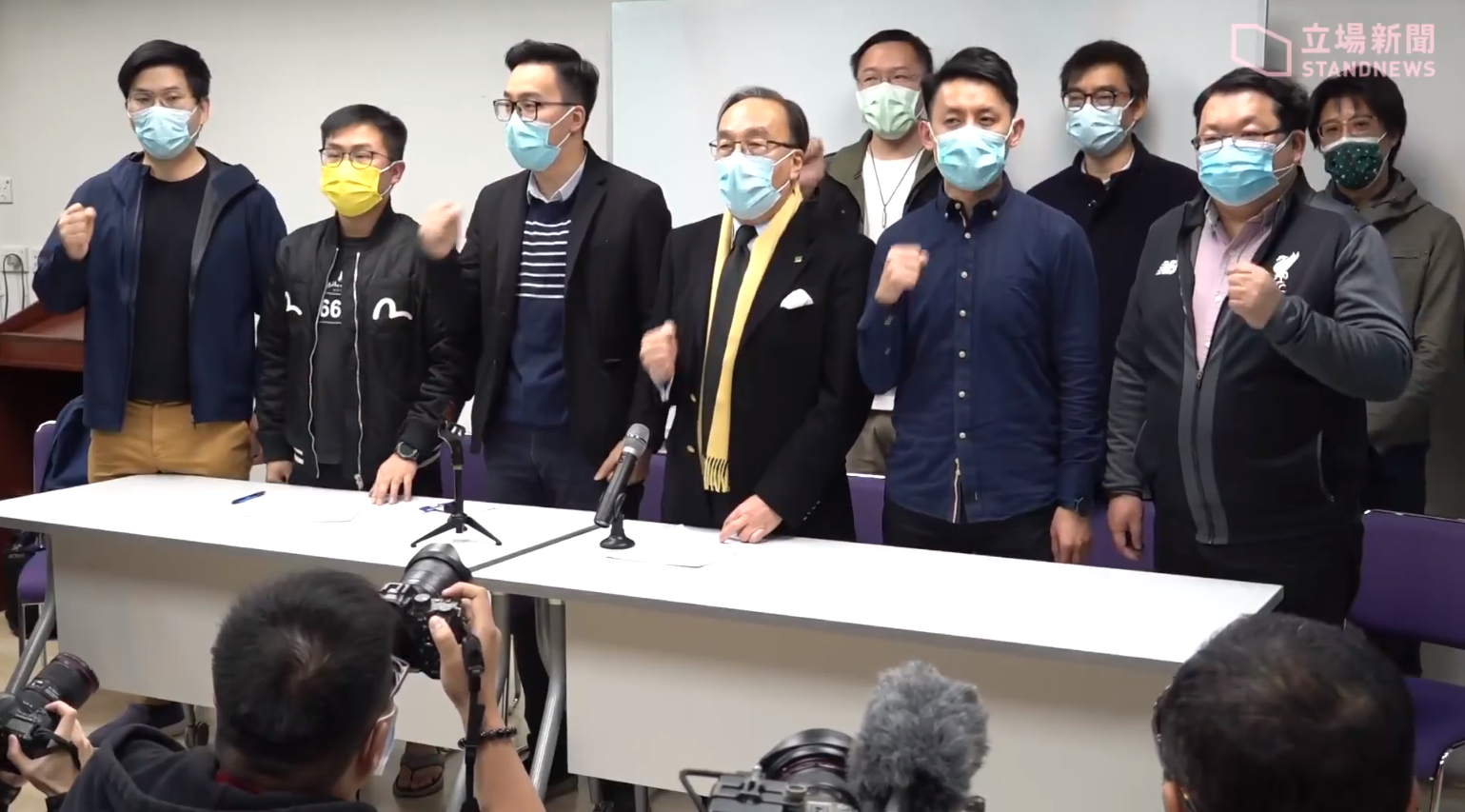
Pro-democracy camp responds to the arrests by the National Security Department of the Hong Kong Police

In the morning, the police arrested at least 54 pan-democrats, including Democratic Party member Wu Chi-wai, James To, Andrew Wan, Lam Cheuk-ting, Civic Party member Alvin Yeung, League of Social Democrats member Jimmy Sham, convenor of Shatin Community Network Ventus Lau, Southern District Councillor Tiffany Yuen, former reporter Gwyneth Ho, director of the Hong Kong Public Opinion Research Institute Robert Chung, and Benny Tai, a former associate professor of the Faculty of Law of the University of Hong Kong. The arrests were due to their involvement as participants or in other capacities in the 2020 Hong Kong pro-democracy primaries. The police also arrived at the Ho, Tse, Wai & Partners law firm to arrest lawyer John Clancey, a United States citizen who was treasurer of Power for Democracy, an organization associated with the primaries.

Secretary for Security John Lee said that the arrested were suspected of subverting state power, a crime under the Hong Kong national security law. The plan by democrats, devised by Benny Tai, was to win at least 35 seats in the Legislative Council and to repeatedly veto the government's budget, thereby forcing the chief executive to step down.

=== Police officers visit three media outlets ===
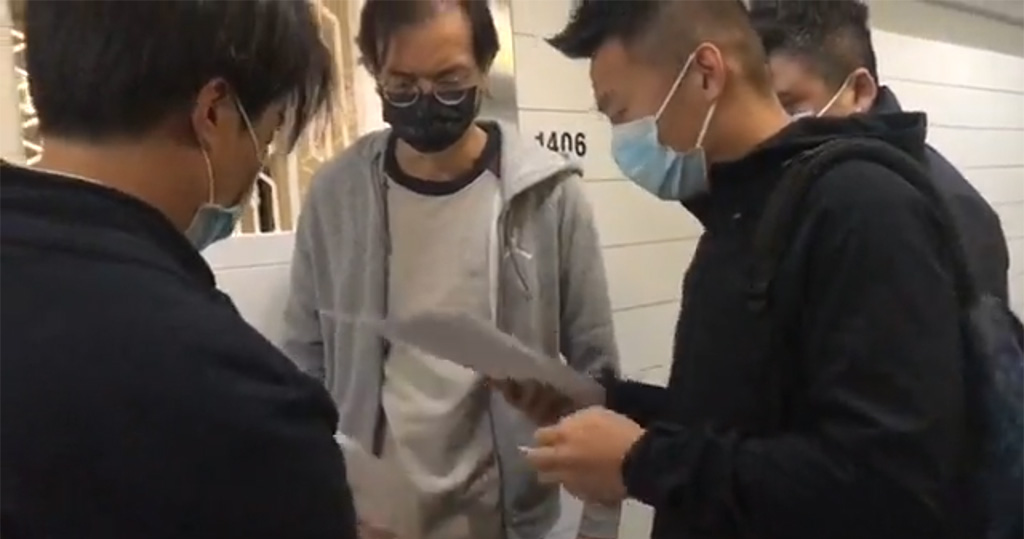
National Security police officers showing documents to Stand News editor-in-chief Chung Pui-kuen on 6 January

National Security Department of the Hong Kong Police dispatched plainclothes officers to the Stand News office, requesting editor-in-chief Chung Pui-kuen to sign a government order demanding documents; Chung declined to elaborate for legal reasons. Later, independent media and Apple Daily were asked to provide information about the primary election candidates within seven days.

== 7 January ==
=== Joshua Wong and Tam Tak-chi arrested in prison ===
In the morning, jailed activist Joshua Wong, the former secretary-general of Demosistō, and the vice chairman of the People Power Tam Tak-chi were arrested at Shek Pik Prison and Lai Chi Kok Reception Center, bringing the total number of those arrested in connection with the July 2020 primaries to 55.

=== Hong Kong Chronicles website blocked in Hong Kong ===
Some Hong Kong netizens discovered that the HKChronicles website that was used to dox (publish) police officers’ personal data during the 2019-2020 Hong Kong protests could not be browsed and could only be connected via VPN. Chief editor of the website, Naomi Chan, pointed out that statistics showed that the number of users of the website from Hong Kong dropped sharply, and also revealed that local network providers such as SmarTone, China Mobile Hong Kong, Hong Kong Broadband and PCCW deliberately discarded the data sent by users, making it impossible to browse the website. She also received news from employees working at CSL and SmarTone that the government was asking Hong Kong Internet service providers to block certain websites. The police stated that they would not comment on individual cases, but according to Article 43 of the national security law and Schedule 4 of its Implementation Rules, service providers may be required to block access to electronic information deemed likely to constitute a crime endangering national security. A doxing website targeting pro-democracy protesters, as well as journalists, was reported on 11 January to remain accessible in Hong Kong.

=== Pro-democracy activists released on bail ===
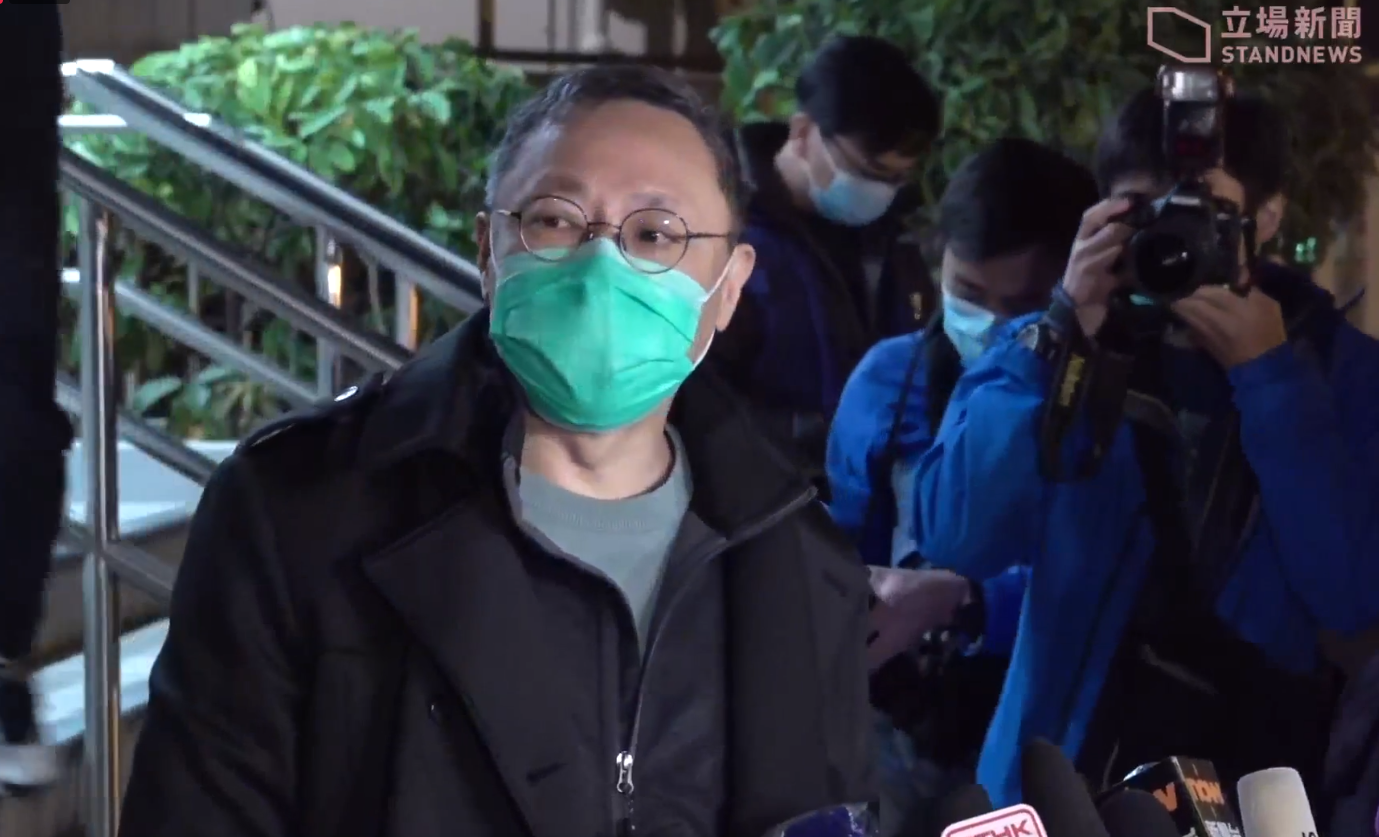
Benny Tai speaking to the media after he was released on bail

All of the democrats who had been arrested on 6 January were released, with most of them posting a bail of HK$30,000 and handing in their travel documents, while some, including Claudia Mo, had their computers and mobile phones confiscated by police. Joshua Wong and Tam Tak-chi remained in jail, while Wu Chi-wai had his bail revoked because he failed to surrender his BNO passport and was remanded on separate charges. Former associate professor of the Law Department of the University of Hong Kong, Benny Tai, who initiated the pro-democracy primaries, said after his release at the Ma On Shan Police Station close to midnight, "Hong Kong has entered into a bitter winter, the wind blowing is strong and cold. But I believe that many Hong Kong people will still use their own ways to battle the wind."

== 8 January ==
=== Sentencing of Fu Guohao's attacker ===
District Court Judge Clement Lee pronounced the sentence and sentenced the three defendants in the attack on Global Times reporter Fu Guohao to 4 years, 3 months to 5 1/2 years in prison. The judge also pointed out that the Court of Appeal required the lower judges to consider the impact of such cases on the community.

== 9 January ==
=== Coroner's Court rules that the cause of Chow Tsz-lok's death is in doubt ===
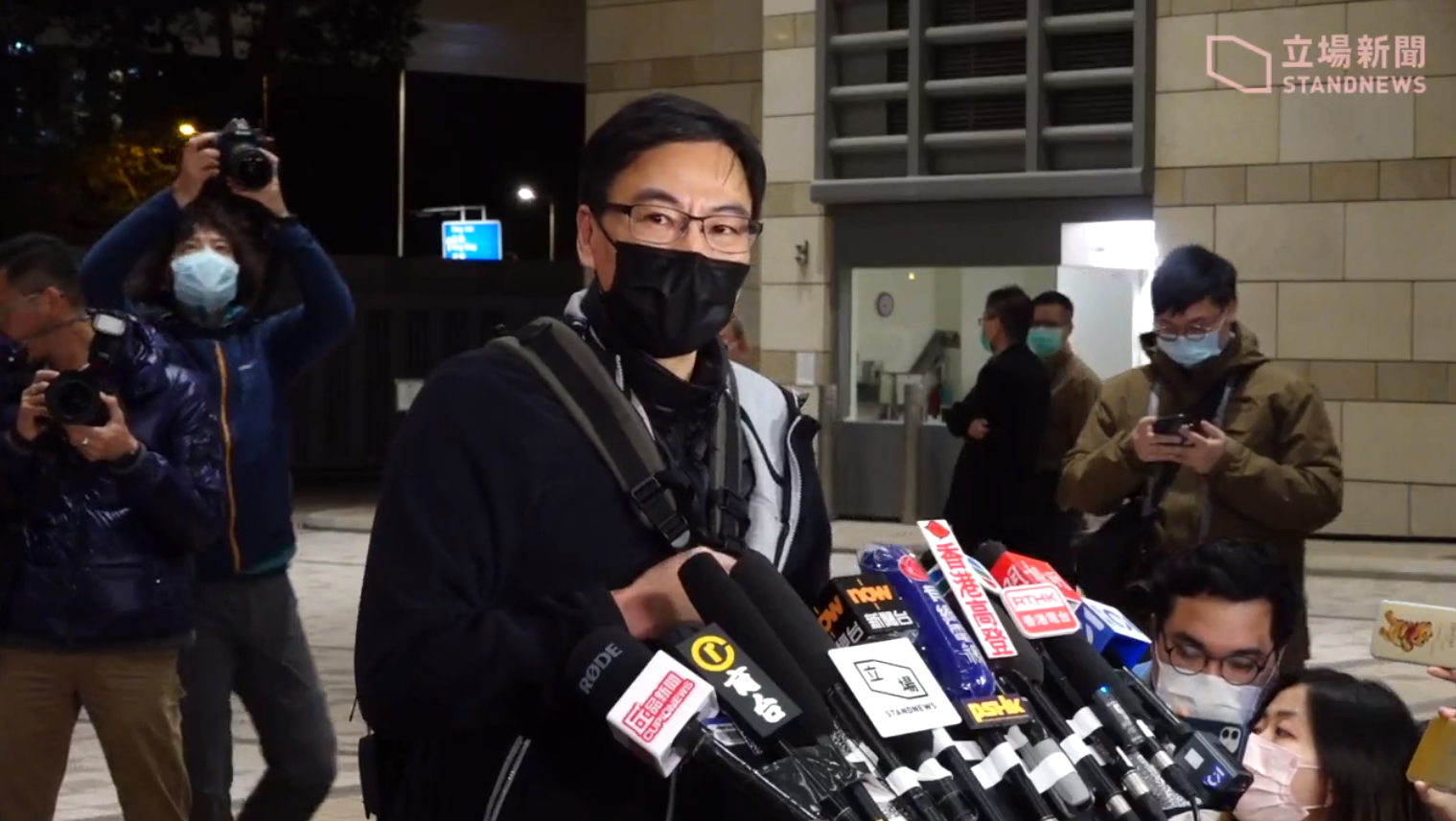
Chow Tsz-lok's father responds to the ruling in the front of reporters

With 48 witness testimonies having been submitted to the Coroner's Court, and after 17 hours of closed-door discussions by a jury composed of two men and three women, the judge provided the jury with three ruling options, namely 'illegal killing', 'died by accident' and 'doubtful ruling'. It was ruled 4 to 1 that the cause of death of Chow was in doubt. Coroner Ko Wai-hung described the inquiry as having "almost arrived at the truth" and that, if the parking lot security camera had moved up by five degrees, or if another camera at the site had moved at slower speed, the truth could have been revealed. The jury proposed at the same time that the closed-circuit television system of the parking lot involved be updated, automatic real-time settings be added, and a railing be added to the stone wall on the third floor.

=== Danish politicians wanted in Hong Kong ===
Danish media Politiken reported that the Hong Kong authorities were investigating the exile of Ted Hui and were considering requesting the extradition of two Danish parliamentarians Uffe Elbaek and Katarina Ammitzbøll for sending false invitations to environmental protection meetings to assist Hui in exile. Danish Foreign Minister Jeppe Kofod said that his government "utterly" defended the right of Danish politicians to meet with whoever they wanted without fear of reprisals. There is no extradition agreement between Denmark and Hong Kong.

== 10 January ==
=== Regina Ip urges authorities to ban Hong Kong people from holding dual nationality ===
Executive Council member and chairwoman of the New People's Party Regina Ip wrote in the South China Morning Post that it was time for China to end the special treatment of Hong Kong people and strictly enforce the Chinese nationality law to prohibit dual nationality. This was in response to the central government's consideration of countermeasures against possibility of 5.4 million eligible Hong Kong residents potentially being able to emigrate to the UK through a British National (Overseas) Passport visa.

=== Hong Kong government refutes foreign ministers remarks ===
A spokesperson of the Hong Kong government denounced a joint statement by the foreign ministers of Australia, Canada, United Kingdom, and the United States Secretary of State on the raids for the pro-democracy primaries, stating that Hong Kong had a constitutional responsibility to safeguard national security.

== 11 January ==
=== District Court judge orders lawyer and audience to leave because of yellow masks ===
During the hearing of a case of four suspects who pled guilty that day in the case of the violent clash inside Amoy Plaza on September 14, 2019, District Court Judge Ernest Lin asked the three present defendants, all of whom were wearing yellow masks, to leave the courtroom. He clarified on 13 January that it had been the protester slogans implied by the letters on at least one of the face coverings that had caused the ban, rather than the color commonly associated with the protesters.

Judge Lin alleged that reporters from the yellow vests at the scene had prevented the victims from leaving. Hong Kong Journalists Association issued a statement to rebuke this. The judge later said, "I believe professional journalists would not [knowingly] commit an offence, but the footage from that day could indeed cause misunderstandings."

=== One arrested after melee at CUHK entrance checkpoint ===
It was the start day of the next semester of the Chinese University of Hong Kong. At 12:15 pm, CUHK campus radio said about 8-9 people in black and masked clothes outside the university station shouted at passers-by not to show their ID card, in protest of the closed-campus policy which the university had implemented after the November 2019 siege of the university, only admitting those with a valid student or alumni ID. The people then pushed down the iron fence and left. Some threw an unknown white powder at the security guard who chased them. Afterwards, the police arrested one of the men. The school confirmed that he was a CUHK student. He was sent to Ma On Shan Police Station for investigation on suspicion of disrupting public order and ordinary assault. The school also confirmed that a security guard had been sprayed with powder and was sent to the hospital for observation; and that the incident involved an assault, which had led to the police being called. The powder was later found to be corn starch.

Four students were charged in the case. One pleaded guilty in August 2022 and was sentenced to six weeks in prison in September. In early March 2023, a magistrate dismissed the case against one defendant and on 24 March, the remaining two were acquitted, in each case due to insufficient evidence.

== 12 January ==
=== Police sending the seized electronic devices of arrested persons to China ===
The Washington Post reported that after the pro-democracy primaries, Hong Kong police believed that the Chinese authorities had advanced technology to extract information from electronic devices for investigation, and therefore shipped their electronic devices to mainland China. After the electronic devices of some of the arrested persons were seized, their social media accounts or emails showed abnormal activities. For example, Tam Tak-chi re-used Telegram, and the Facebook administrator clarified that Tam did not reopen the account. After Raymond Chan was arrested, his Telegram was also invaded. The report also quoted an unnamed police officer as saying that the Cyber Security and Technology Crime Investigation Bureau had methods to damage the Android system and Google cloud data, and was convinced that the anti-extradition bill protests that occurred in 2019 had been carefully planned. Police, he continued, sought to understand the interconnections between democrats and civil society.

=== 14 Hong Kong exiles granted refugee status in Canada ===
A Canadian organization New Hong Kong Cultural Association of Canada, which assists Hong Kong people in exile, stated that the Canadian Immigration and Refugee Commission had approved refugee status for 14 Hongkongers in exile since the end of 2020.

== 14 January ==
=== Democrats arrested for assisting fugitives flee to Taiwan ===
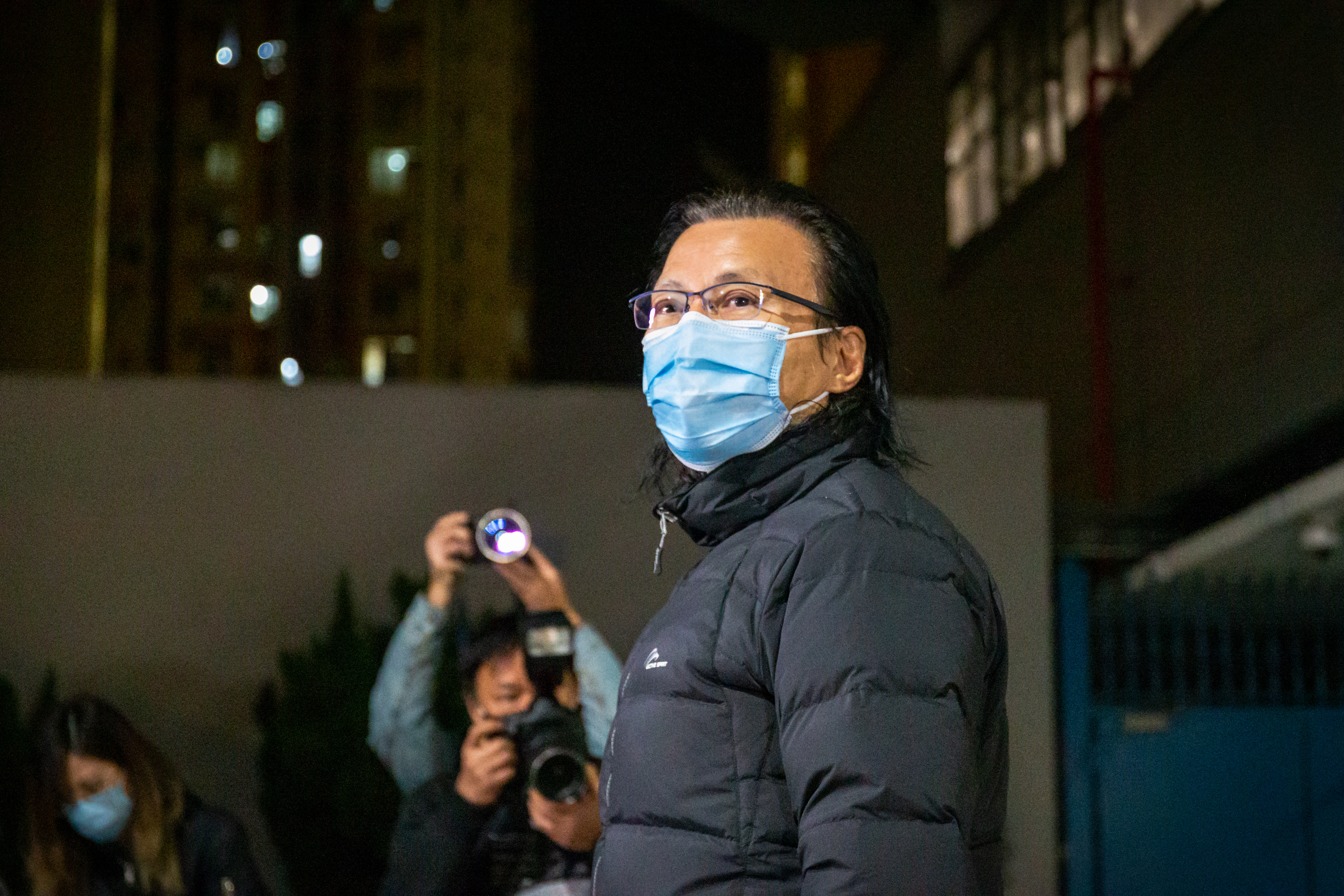
Daniel Wong Kwok-tung released on bail

In the morning, the National Security Department of the Hong Kong Police arrested 11 people, including the Kowloon City District Councillor and lawyer Daniel Wong, the mother of the former deputy secretary-general of the Hong Kong Federation of Students Willis Ho, and the musician Rono Fok. It is reported that they were suspected of 'conspiracy to assist fugitives' in the 12 Hong Kong people case, including sponsorships involving thousands to tens of thousands dollars, introduction of intermediaries, transportation and provision of accommodation. Many people have been detained for more than 38 hours for investigation. They were released on bail pending further investigation on the next day and had to report to the police in mid-March.

=== HKBN blocks HKChronicles due to National Security Law ===
Hong Kong Broadband Network stated that it had stopped users from connecting to the HKChronicles website on the afternoon of 13 January in accordance with the requirements of the national security law.

== 15 January ==
=== Two suspects in the Ma On Shan arson case have absconded overseas ===
Investigations of an incident that took place at Ma On Shan on 11 November 2019, in which a man was set on fire and sustained extensive second-degree burns, made new progress. The police informed that the two males (17 and 25 years old) involved in the case had fled overseas by plane in November and December 2019, respectively. Police investigations also revealed that the departure tickets of the two wanted males had been purchased by a 60-year-old and a 39-year-old man, both unrelated to the suspects. The two were arrested on suspicion of assisting fugitives. The two were released on bail pending further investigation and ordered to report to the police in late February.

=== Teacher investigated for the use of biased teaching materials ===
According to media reports, a government school teacher in Hong Kong has used inappropriate and biased teaching materials and has been transferred and investigated by the authorities. The relevant investigation has been completed, and Education Bureau is considering canceling his teacher registration.

=== U.S. imposes sanctions on six Hong Kong and mainland Chinese officials ===
The U.S. Department of the Treasury announced sanctions against six persons involved in the large-scale raid on 6 January, including Cai Zhanpeng, Director of the National Security Department of the Hong Kong Police; Jiang Xueli, assistant director of the Police (National Security); and assistant director of the Police (National Security) Jian Qien; deputy director of the National Security Administration Sun Qingye; Standing Committee of the National People's Congress member Tam Yiu-chung and Secretary of the Secretariat of the CPC Central Committee and Minister of the United Front Work Department You Quan.

=== Five people seek asylum in the US ===
Hong Kong-American citizen Samuel Chu, issued a statement through the Hong Kong Democracy Council, an American organization which he headed. With assistance, they arrived in the United States that week and planned to apply for political asylum. The statement said that although the five people have left their families and Hong Kong, they were now physically safe. After the United States and other 'enthusiastic supporters' have been providing asylum and protection, the five people have finally obtained refugee status in the United States. The organization would help with five to seek political asylum and start a new life there.

== 18 January ==
=== Sentencing of a volunteer in Wan Chai protest ===
A 25-year-old volunteer first responder had been charged for riot and unlicensed possession of radio communication devices at a protest in Wan Chai on August 31, 2019. The District Court sentenced the defendant to four years in prison and a fine of HK$5,000.

== 19 January ==
=== HKJA withdraw appeal on police interview case ===
The Hong Kong Journalists Association issued a statement that said that after consulting the legal team, weighing the costs of the appeal and taking into account other judicial cases, it has decided not to appeal the allegations that 13 journalists had been obstructed by police officers from interviewing or treated roughly.

== 20 January ==
=== Chinese countermeasures against new U.S. sanctions ===
Countersanctions against U.S. officials, which had been foreshadowed by Chinese Foreign Affairs spokeswoman Hua Chunying on 18 January, were imposed on 28 individuals of the outgoing Trump administration, including Secretary of State Mike Pompeo. They were accused by China of "lying and cheating".

== 21 January ==
=== Kim Jong-un impersonator arrested ===
Howard X, a Kim Jong-un impersonator who often appeared in demonstrations, revealed on his social media that he was arrested on 28 October 2020 by police officers on suspicion of possessing firearms without a license. He held a search warrant and claimed that he was arrested in April last year. There was an email mentioning that a BB gun was sent to him. He stated that he had never received firearms. The police believed that the BB bullet gun had energy output and was detained for nearly 6 hours for investigation without finding any firearms. However, the case has not been committed after three months, but he must be released on HK$3,000 cash bail and report to the airport police station every six weeks. He suspected that the reason for his arrest was not the BB bullet gun, but the satirical appearance at the demonstration site in the past year, believing that the police arrested him without reasonable grounds. He stated that he is not a demonstration, but a performance art of one person.

=== EU Parliament passes resolution on Hong Kong ===
The European Parliament passed a resolution stating that it condemned China's suppression of Hong Kong opposition figures, and called on all of its member countries to sanction Chief Executive Carrie Lam and other officials. It further called on the Hong Kong government to immediately and unconditionally release all activists arrested on suspicion of violating the 'subversion of state power' provision of the Hong Kong national security law.

The spokesperson of the Chinese Mission to the European Union expressed strong condemnation and firm opposition to the passage of the Hong Kong-related resolution by the European Parliament, saying that some members of the European Parliament confused right and wrong, and grossly interfered in Hong Kong affairs and China's internal affairs. The Hong Kong government issued a statement on the same day, strongly opposing the European Parliament's 'resolution', claiming that the content was biased and out of political motives rather than reflecting facts.

== 22 January ==
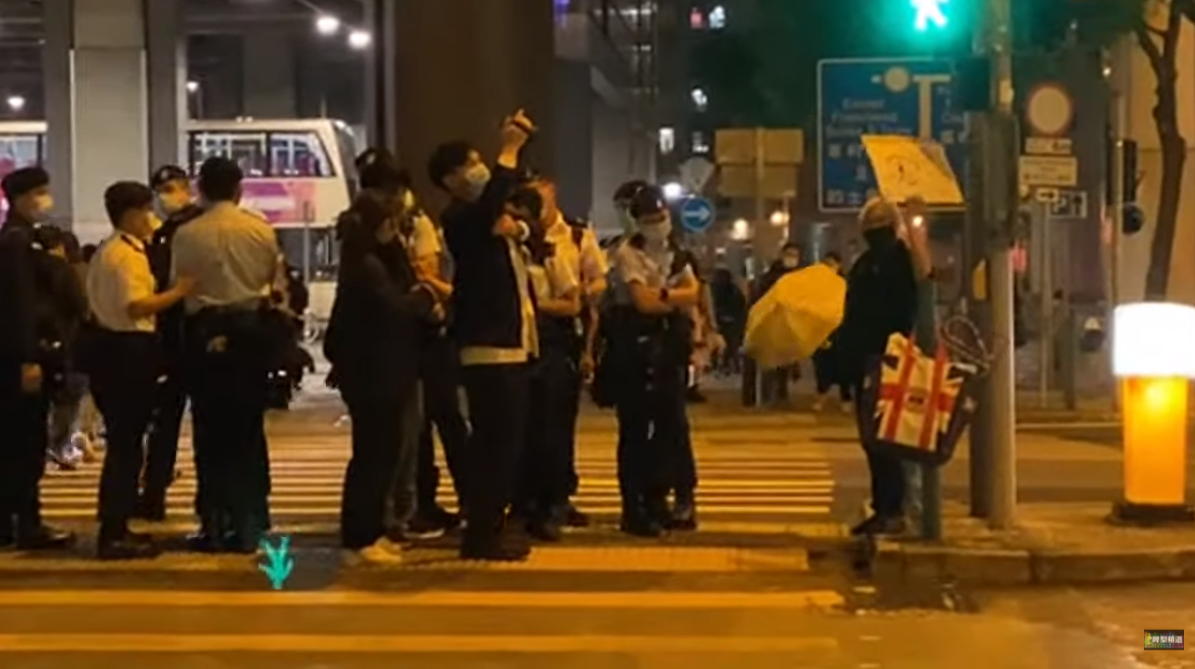
Grandma Wong raised a sign at the Sheung Tak intersection in Tseung Kwan O and was arrested by the police

Chan Yin-lam passed away 1 year and 4 months, and some citizens initiated a silent tribute at the Shang Tak intersection in Tseung Kwan O. At about 7 o'clock in the evening, Grandma Wong raised a sign at the crossing, and was arrested for obstructing the police officers.

== 25 January ==
=== HKUST student union members disciplined for memorial service for Chow Tsz-lok ===
At least 6 members of the HKUST Students’ Union organized the 'Half-Year Memorial for Chow Tsz-lok's Death' on campus in May 2020 and repainted the campus floor with the large-character slogan 'hope lies in the people, and change begins with resistance', which had first appeared during the 2014 Hong Kong protests. Members of the union were also penalized for posting promotional material relating to the 2019–2020 Hong Kong protests on the union's noticeboard. Penalties handed out included six-month bans on using campus facilities, a 75-hour campus serving order, and a disciplinary record. The president and internal vice-president of the student union were additionally suspended for one semester. The university said in a statement that the students would receive a hearing in the disciplinary process, and given the opportunity to file an appeal. The student union president said that he would appeal the decision, and: "Facing the school's oppression, we will never concede."

=== Three CUHK students arrested in connection with 11 January CUHK incident ===
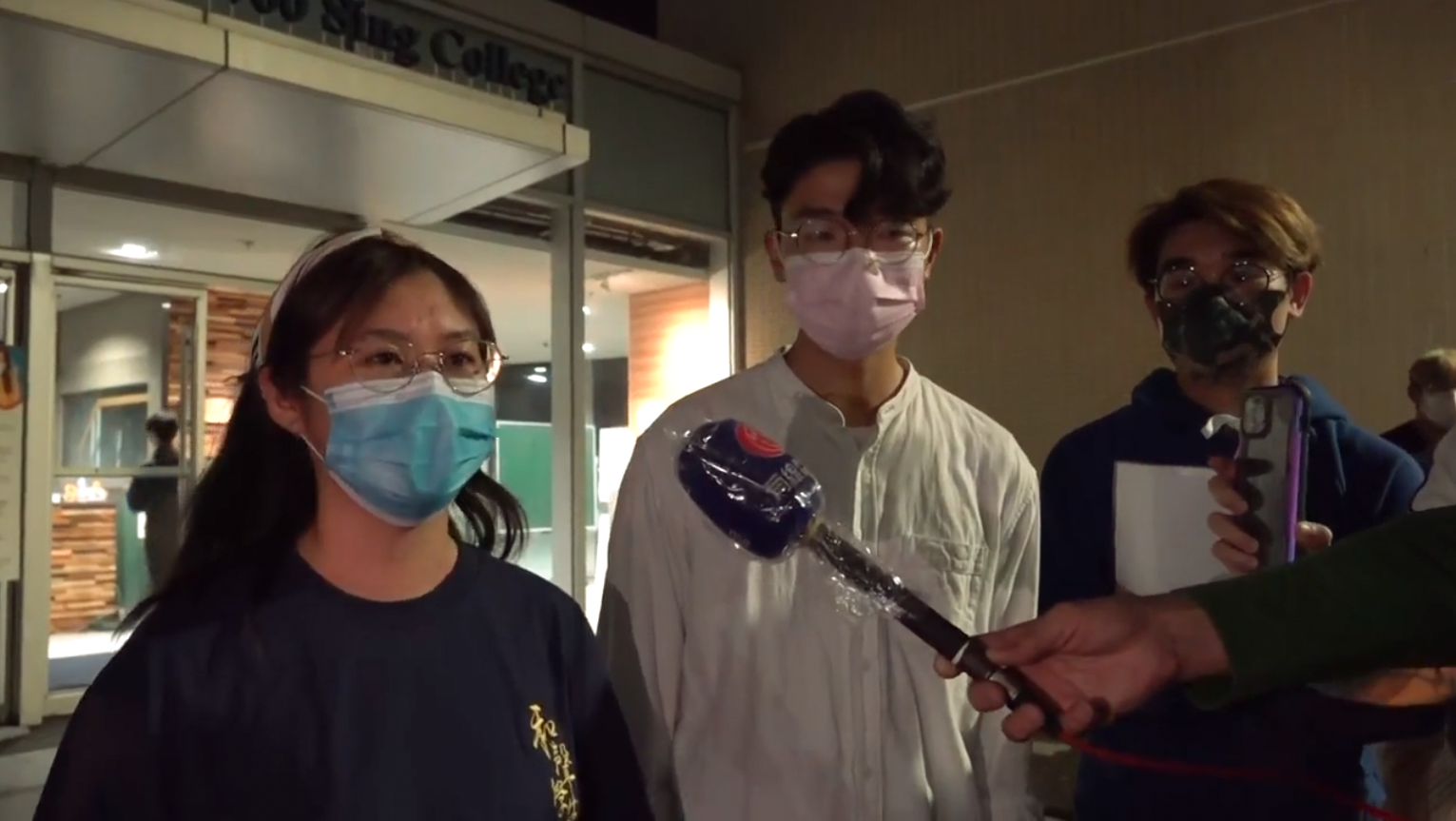
CUHK Students Union president responds to the search of a dormitory by police

In the evening, the New Territories South Regional Crime Squad of the police entered the campus of the Chinese University of Hong Kong to search with a court warrant in relation to the 11 January incident in which metal fences had been pushed down and guards been attacked. They searched three student dormitories and arrested three students, among them former student union president Owen Au Cheuk-hei, on suspicion of unlawful assembly and assault with intent.

=== Criminal convictions ===
A 14-year-old teenager was convicted on one count of damage in a Best Mart 360 store in Tin Shui Wai on 24 February 2020. Since 2019, the snack-shop chain had been the target of the ire of protesters for having ties with "Fujian gangs" that were seen as responsible for an attack on protesters in August 2019.

A 21-year-old student was convicted of having smeared the wooden hoarding at the HSBC ATM Center in Wan Chai during the New Year's Day parade in Hong Kong in 2020 and tried to escape the police. He was charged with two counts of criminal damage and resisting arrest. He was sentenced to 5 months and 2 weeks in jail at the Eastern Magistrates' Court. Magistrate Cheung Chi-wai reprimanded the defendant for his selfish behavior. Five months' imprisonment were used as the starting point for the punishment for the criminal damage; the crime of resisting arrest is two weeks.

== 26 January ==
=== Carrie Lam urges Biden administration to be fair on Hong Kong national security measures ===
Chief Executive Carrie Lam attended the Hong Kong China-US Forum seminar. When talking about U.S. President Joe Biden taking office, she mentioned that the former Trump administration's sanctions against the Hong Kong SAR government, enterprises and individuals were 'unjustified' and hoped that the new US administration would treat Hong Kong's national security in a fair manner.

=== Wanted CUHK student surrenders to police ===
A 22-year-old Chinese University of Hong Kong student wanted by the police in relation to the melee that had broken out on campus on 11 January went to Tsuen Wan Police Station to surrender, bringing the number of arrested in relation to the incident to five.

=== Police obtained bank account information of arrested democrats without consent ===
Reuters reported that at least six people arrested in early January for the pro-democracy primaries, including Ventus Lau, Owen Chow, and others, the police obtained bank account records without their consent, including HSBC, Hang Seng Bank, Citibank, Standard Chartered Bank, and others. Among them, Chow said that during the video interview at the time of the arrest, the police took out financial records from Citibank, Hang Seng Bank, HSBC mobile app and PayMe, and asked about the source of funds in his three bank accounts. Afterwards, he also confiscated his Hang Seng Bank and Citibank ATM cards and credit cards. Lau told Stand News that the police showed him a copy of Hang Seng Bank's bill and asked how each amount was obtained. He said that before and after the primary election, he had initiated crowdfunding through the FPS function of his Hang Seng Bank account, so many citizens donated to the account. The remaining four arrested persons claimed that during the police confession, they photocopied a copy of the bank account statement. Two of them stated that the police showed a copy of a monthly statement of Standard Chartered Bank, while the other two refused to disclose the name of the bank.

=== German Bundestag holds a hearing on Hong Kong national security law ===
The German Bundestag held a hearing on the Hong Kong national security law. Glacier Kwong urged Germany to set up a lifeboat plan to enable protesters to arrive in the country. She urged for visa requirements for Hongkongers looking to flee the city be waived, due to difficulties with in-person applications caused by the COVID-19 pandemic. A spokesperson for the Foreign Ministry in Berlin referred to measures already taken by German authorities since the passing of the law.

== 27 January ==
=== Criminal convictions ===
Three men and women participated in blocking roads at Lung Cheung Road in Wong Tai Sin in the previous year's "Ran Dian Hong Kong · Awakening of the People". They were charged with unlawful assembly. After the trial, Kwun Tong Magistrates' Court convicted them for all the charges. The court will ask for their background, detention center and other reports, and postpone their sentence until 10 February, during which the three people are still awaiting punishment.

On the day of the 2020 Hong Kong New Year's Day Parade, a toy designer was found by police from his backpack near the Hong Kong MTR station, including switch knives, lighters, and lighter oil. He pleaded guilty to possession of prohibited weapons and possession of articles with intent to damage property and was sentenced to a social service order of 100 hours earlier. However, the Department of Justice appealed for sentence review, and the sentence was pronounced in the Eastern Magistrate's Court that day. The prosecution claimed that the defendant was carrying a number of different types of goods, and the charges and the circumstances of the case were serious. The sentence was changed to imprisonment. After hearing the statements of the prosecution and defense, the Magistrate Stanley Ho agreed that the relevant factors had not been fully considered at the beginning. The defendant was sentenced to two months in prison.

=== Carrie Lam reports to Xi Jinping and Li Keqiang ===
Chief Executive Carrie Lam reported to Premier Li Keqiang and President Xi Jinping successively. In response to the COVID-19 pandemic, the format was changed to a video report. Xi said that in the past year, Hong Kong government had calmly dealt with multiple severe shocks brought about by the amendments, the COVID-19 pandemic and the adverse changes in the external environment with a certain effect. She specifically pointed out that the Hong Kong national security law, resolutely implemented by the Hong Kong government, had stopped violence and chaos in accordance with the law, and that she would strive to bring Hong Kong back to normal. Xi Jinping stressed the principal of "patriots governing Hong Kong" being fundamental to national sovereignty and security. In addition, Xi asked Lam to convey his condolences to relevant Hong Kong officials who have been sanctioned by the United States.

=== Financial department asks fund managers and bankers to explain the reasons for their withdrawal from Hong Kong ===
The Financial Times quoted three sources as reporting that some fund managers and bankers who had left Hong Kong to work in Singapore or Tokyo had received calls from various financial departments in Hong Kong, including the Securities and Futures Commission, Monetary Authority, the Financial Services and the Treasury Bureau, and the Financial Services Development Council, asking them to explain their reasons for their step. The Financial Times inquired with relevant departments, and the China Securities Regulatory Commission stated that it would make inquiries with licensed corporations or individuals that had changed their business locations in order to understand whether they needed to retain their licenses. HKMA stated that it would normally maintain communication with the industry, and it did not understand why someone leaving Hong Kong would cause special attention.

== 28 January ==
=== Criminal convictions ===
A 21-year-old male student was found by police officers in Sha Tin Town Hall on 5 November 2019 with two concrete-filled Railcoms. He was charged in 2020 with the offence of possession of offensive weapons in public places under the Public Order Ordinance. In August, he pleaded guilty, and Magistrate Jason Wan sentenced him to 10 days in prison. However, the public prosecutors refused to serve the sentence and commended the sentence for a review. The Court of Appeal stated that it believed that the original magistrate's sentence had been "obviously too light"; later the defendant was sentenced to 3 months' imprisonment.

=== RTHK condemned for episode of satirical show Headliner ===
Communications Authority alleges that the RTHK program Headliner was convicted of violating the TV Program Code during the three episodes of Shock Report broadcast on 28 February, 13 March and 10 April 2020. The bureau believed that the host He Wong dressing up as a police officer and emerging from a trash can involved slandering and insulting police officers, misquoting a police officer's speech and distorting its meaning, expressing death cases misleading the audience, and beautifying criminal activities. A strong condemnation to RTHK was issued.

== 29 January ==
=== Female nurse sentenced for disclosing personal data without consent on Instagram ===
A 25-year-old female nurse in the clinic obtained the personal information of the police officer seeking treatment on the computer in the clinic, and then posted a screenshot of the information on Instagram using a common derogatory term for police. She admitted to using the computer dishonestly and disclosing personal data obtained without the consent of the data user. Chief Magistrate of the Kowloon City Magistrates' Court Ada Yim said that the case involved a certain degree of public interest, and that the crime was easy to commit and difficult to detect and required deterrent penalties. She believed that the starting point for the defendant's sentence should be 9 to 12 months' imprisonment.

=== Chinese and Hong Kong governments no longer recognize BNO passport ===
The British government has proposed opening up arrangements for Hong Kong residents holding British National (Overseas) passports to immigrate to the UK. Chinese Ministry of Foreign Affairs stated that starting from 31 January, China will no longer recognize the so-called BNO passport as a travel document and identity proof, and reserves the right to take further measures. To describe the British side's attempt to turn a large number of Hong Kong people into second-class British citizens, that the so-called BNO is no longer the original BNO. SAR government subsequently announced that it would fully cooperate with the country's countermeasures against BNO matters, and would not recognize BNO as a valid travel document and identity proof. From 31 January, BNO holders cannot be used for entry and exit from Hong Kong. The statement criticized the British government's hypocrisy. It described the British government's actions as obviously political hype, saying that the Hong Kong people's new path to residence and naturalization in the UK was just an excuse, nor should the BNO initiative should be used as a political cover' to escort.

== 31 January ==
=== Chinese states agencies condemn UK ===
The Hong Kong and Macau Affairs Office issued a statement expressing strong opposition to the policy of residence and naturalization of BNO passport holders in the UK, describing the British approach as a flagrant offence to China's sovereignty. They considered that the action vby the UK seriously violated the Sino-British Joint Declaration.

=== Carrie Lam and Luo Huining visit Hong Kong Police Force ===
Chief Executive Carrie Lam, Director of the Hong Kong Liaison Office Luo Huining, and others visited the Hong Kong Police Headquarters and Tsim Sha Tsui Police Station in West Kowloon Region, and conveyed the sincere greetings from the central leadership to the Hong Kong Police Force and all disciplined service personnel. Lam said that Hong Kong police officers had done a lot of work in the past year, whether it was to stop violence and chaos or prevent and control the pandemic, which deserved full recognition. Luo presented the pennant of 'loyalty, courage, fearlessness' to the police force, and emphasized that the police force should stand up and enforce the law strictly under the motto of 'stop violence, restrain chaos, and restore order'.

=== Returning Valiant street booth fined ===
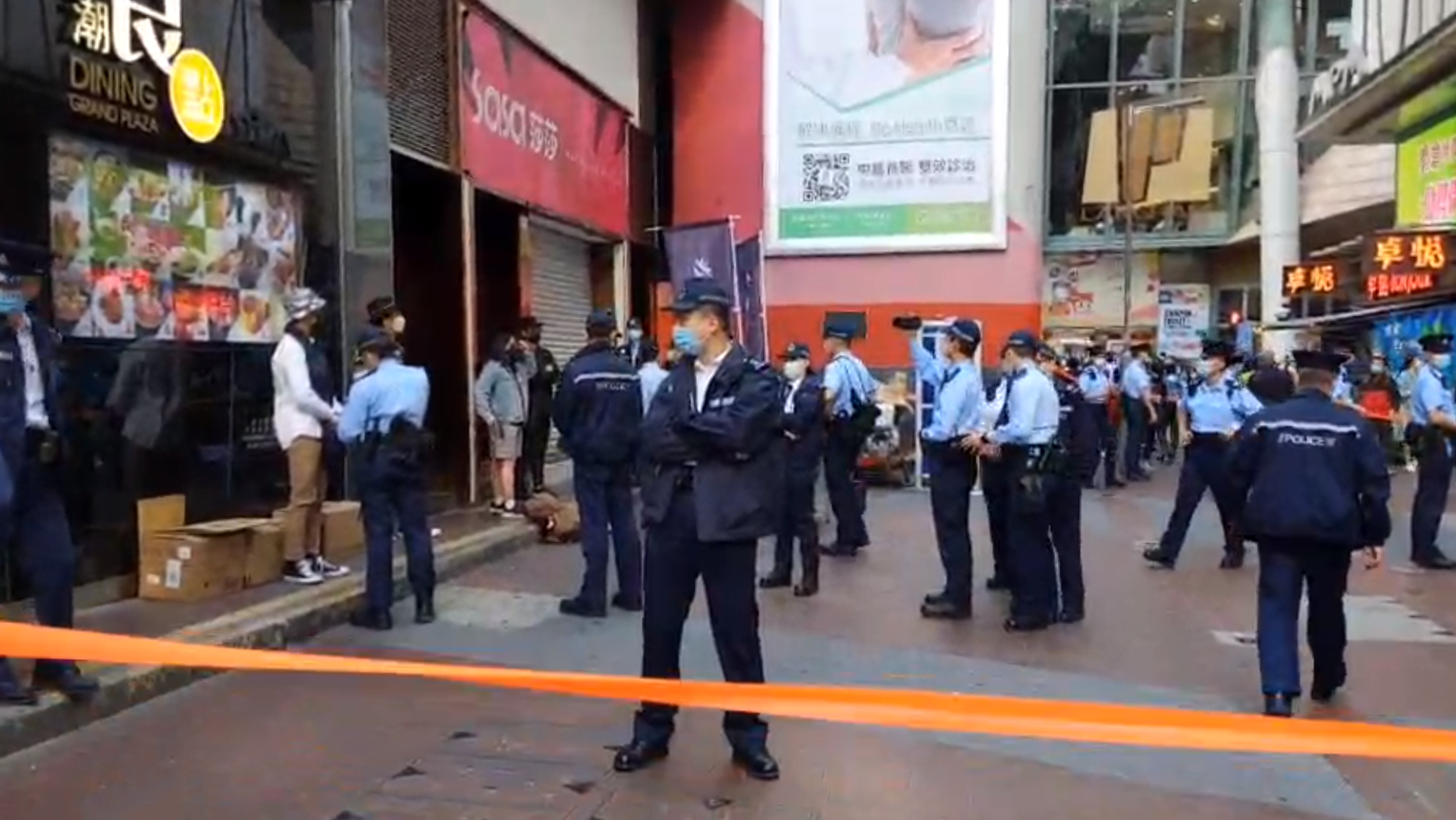
30 police officers arrived at the scene to surround the street booths, and 5 members were intercepted

At about 1 pm, the middle school student organization 'Returning Valiant' introduced the history of the French Revolution and the pro-EU demonstrations in Ukraine at Exit E of Mong Kok station, near Grand Plaza. However, by 3 pm, nearly 30 police officers surrounded the five members and pulled up the orange tape to cordon and inspect them for about 30 minutes. Some members stated that the police officers pointed out that they had the opportunity to violate the national security law and also stated that they would not pay a fine. However, they were later issued a fine of 5,000 Hong Kong dollars for breaching the coronavirus gathering restrictions.

=== U.S. wants to provide a safe haven to Hong Kong people ===
In an interview with NBC, U.S. Secretary of State Antony Blinken criticized China's actions against Hong Kong as a breach of its commitment to the city. The United States should assist Hong Kong people who are victims of oppression and provide them with a safe haven, he said. Chinese Foreign Ministry spokesperson Wang Wenbin responded at a regular press conference held on 2 February that Hong Kong affairs were purely China's internal affairs and no foreign country had the right to interfere. Yang Jiechi, member of the Political Bureau of the CPC Central Committee and director of the Office of the Central Committee for Foreign Affairs, also urged the United States to stop interfering in Hong Kong affairs.

=== Nearly 30% of the young people surveyed intend to immigrate ===
Youth Research Centre of the Hong Kong Federation of Youth Groups published a survey that interviewed 525 young people aged 18 to 34. It shows that nearly 30% of the young people interviewed intend to immigrate, and more than half of them were intending to do so due to the national security law. The survey also showed that 43.6% of the young people interviewed expressed no hope for the future of Hong Kong.
