= Books Kinokuniya =

Japanese bookstore chain

Kinokuniya

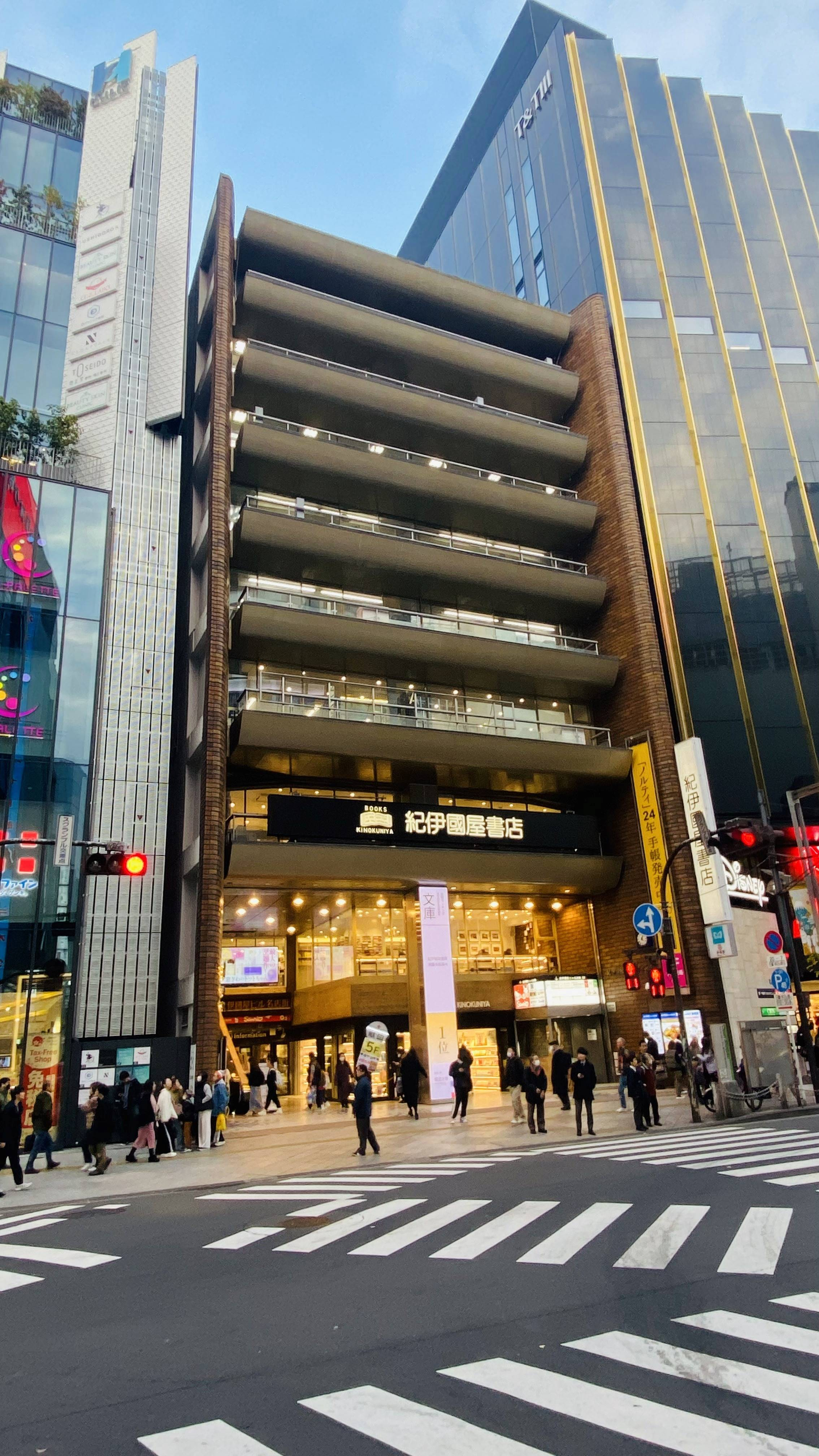
- Books Kinokuniya main store in Shinjuku, Tokyo
- Native name: 紀伊國屋書店
- Industry: Retail
- Founded: 22 January 1927
- Founder: Moichi Tanabe
- Headquarters: 3-7-10, Shimomeguro, Meguro, Tokyo
- Number of locations: 70 (Japan); 44 (overseas)
- Area served: Japan, United States, Singapore, Indonesia, Malaysia, Thailand, Cambodia, Australia, Hong Kong, Taiwan, United Arab Emirates, The Philippines, Bangladesh
- Website: https://www.kinokuniya.com/

Books Kinokuniya (紀伊國屋書店, Kinokuniya Shoten) is a Japanese bookstore chain operated by Kinokuniya Company Ltd. (株式会社紀伊國屋書店, Kabushiki-gaisha Kinokuniya Shoten), founded in 1927, with its first store located in Shinjuku, Tokyo, Japan. Its name translates to "Bookstore of Kii Province". The company has its headquarters in Meguro, Tokyo.

== History ==
Kinokuniya was originally a lumber and charcoal dealer in Yotsuya; and after the 1923 Great Kantō earthquake, the business was moved westward to a new location in Shinjuku, where it was refashioned into a book store by former president Moichi Tanabe, opening with a staff of five in January 1927, and included an art gallery on the second floor, as Tanabe believed that bookstores should also serve to promote the arts and culture in general. He named it after Kii Province, given that his ancestor was a servant of the Kii-Tokugawa family; they are not related to the Edo Period merchant Kinokuniya Bunzaemon.

The original building burnt down in May 1945 during an air raid, but reopened in December 1945. Over the next few years, more Kinokuniya shops opened around Japan. In 1964, the Kinokuniya building was built in Shinjuku by Kunio Maekawa to serve as the company's flagship store and headquarters. The property features nine stories with two underground floors, and includes the Kinokuniya Hall and Art Gallery on the 4th floor, a venue known for its cultural events and theatrical, comedic, and musical performances. The building itself was designated a Tokyo Historic Building in 2017.

In 2016, a document revealing discriminatory hiring practices by the company in the 1980s surfaced when it was published by trade unions.

The company owns the Kinokuniya building of San Francisco's Japan Center mall, and has drawn criticism for continuing to charge tenants full rent during the COVID-19 pandemic, putting businesses in San Francisco's historic Japantown at risk.

== Store ==
Kinokuniya is the largest bookstore chain in Japan, with 70 shops around the country, in cities such as Tokyo, Osaka and Fukuoka. There are 44 Kinokuniya shops outside Japan.

Its first overseas store opened in San Francisco in 1969. Several other bookstores have since opened in the United States, in cities including Los Angeles and New York. It then ventured into the Asia-Pacific market, opening its first store in Singapore (Liang Court Store) in 1983. Shops in Taiwan, Indonesia, Malaysia, and Thailand followed suit. In 1996, Kinokuniya opened its first outlet in Australia, located in Sydney's Neutral Bay. It later moved to its present location in George Street in the Central Business District.

Since 2000, Kinokuniya's U.S. store has capitalized on the growing popularity of Japanese popular culture by stocking both English- and Japanese-language books and manga, as well as other Japanese TV, film, and gaming-related merchandise. The New York City branch in Rockefeller Center was the best-known, encompassing, lengthwise, an entire city block. A new store later opened on Avenue of the Americas, near Bryant Park, replacing the old store, which closed at the end of 2007. The bookstore located at 1073 Sixth Ave includes three floors. The top floor has an in-store café with products from nearby Cafe Zaiya, where customers are offered a range of fresh sandwiches, cakes, bento boxes and bubble tea. The middle floor concentrates on English books of all types, while the basement level houses Japanese books and magazines, as well as a wide variety of stationery.

Books Kinokuniya is known for the immense size of its bookshops. For more than 10 years, its store in Ngee Ann City, Singapore, was the largest bookshop in South East Asia, until the opening of the new Gramedia flagship store in Jakarta in 2007.

On January 13, 2010, Kinokuniya opened its first branch in Hong Kong.

Fellow international bookstore chain Page One (headquartered in Singapore) began as the magazine agent for Kinokuniya, but later became independent.

On September 22, 2017, Kinokuniya opened its first branch in Vietnam.

In March 2019, Kinokuniya's Singaporean branch announced that the Liang Court store was to close on April 21, 2019. The Plaza Senayan outlet of Kinokuniya's Indonesian branch closed on April 1, 2021; earlier, Kinokuniya Pondok Indah Mall was closed in 2018.

On November 18, 2022, Kinokuniya opened its first Philippine branch at Mitsukoshi BGC Mall in cooperation with Fully Booked.

In April 2023, Kinokuniya's Indonesian branch opened an outlet on Central Market, PIK 2.

On December 15, 2024, the Plaza Senayan outlet was reopened.

On February 18, 2025, Kinokuniya announced that its Ngee Ann City store in Singapore was to be downsized, with some of the vacated space being reserved for a café.

Books Kinokuniya opened its first South Asian bookstore in Bangladesh on 19 June 2026.

== Overseas stores ==
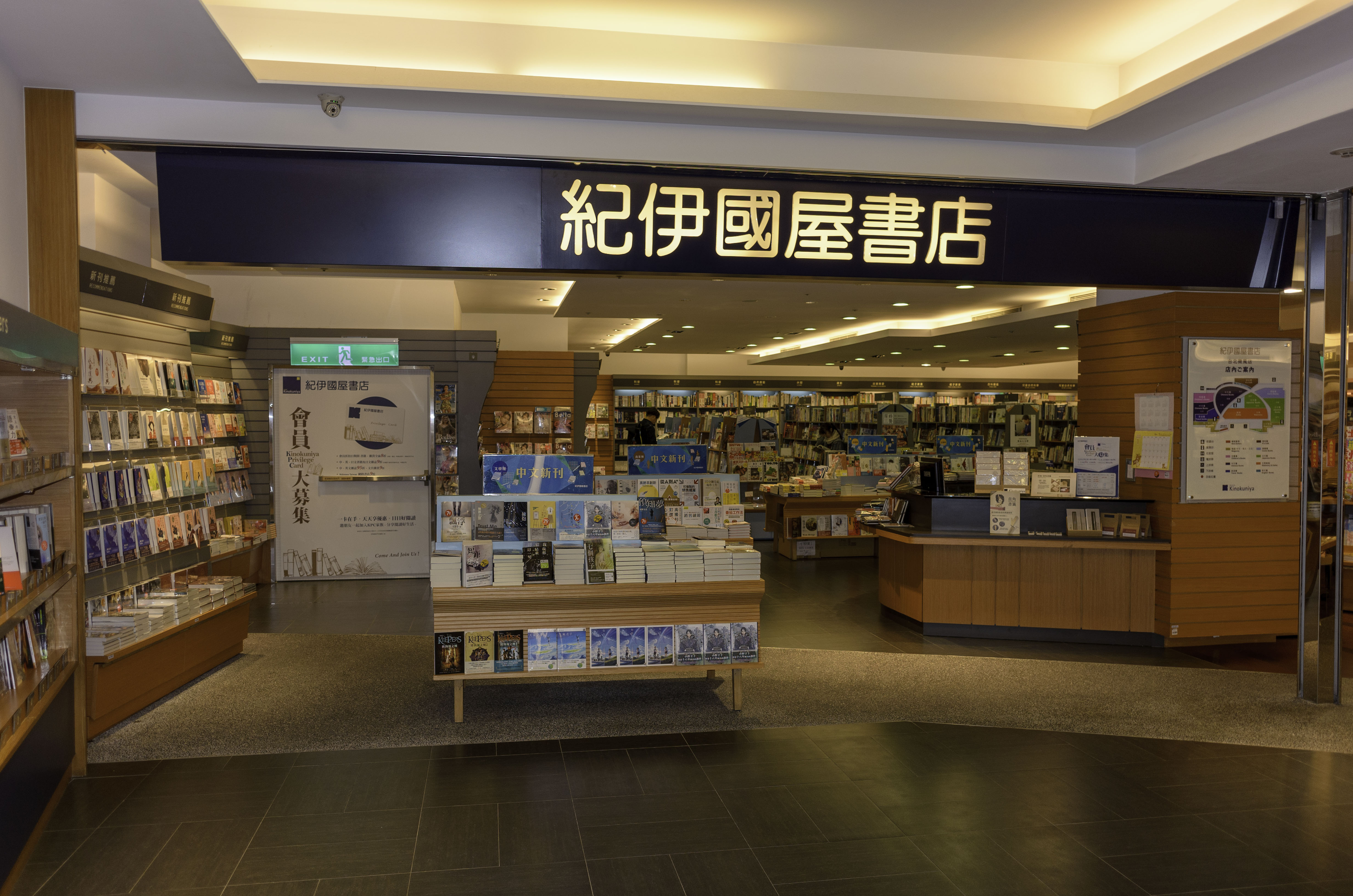
Books Kinokuniya store located in Breeze Center, Taipei

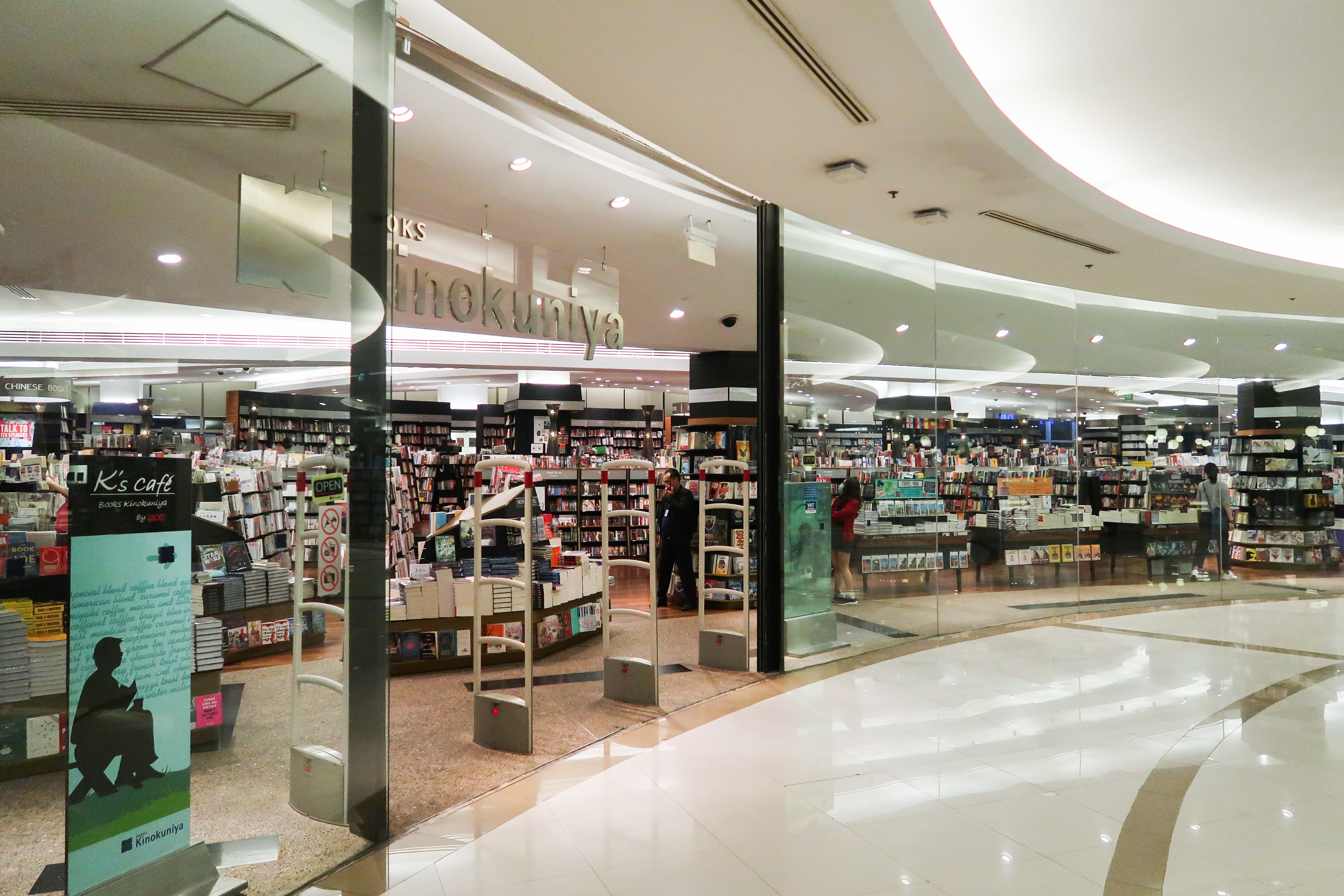
Books Kinokuniya store located in Siam Paragon, Bangkok

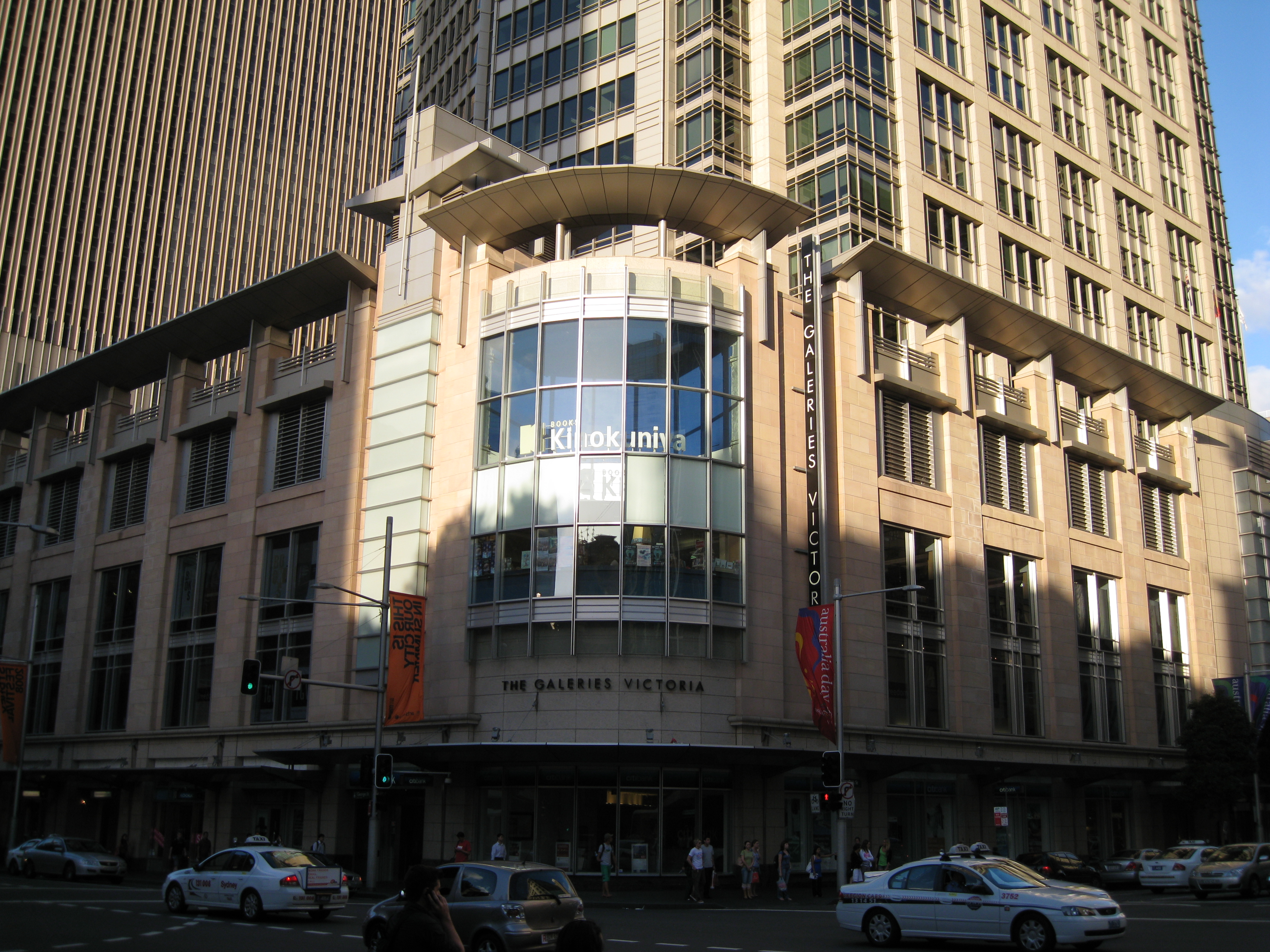
Books Kinokuniya store located in The Galeries, Sydney

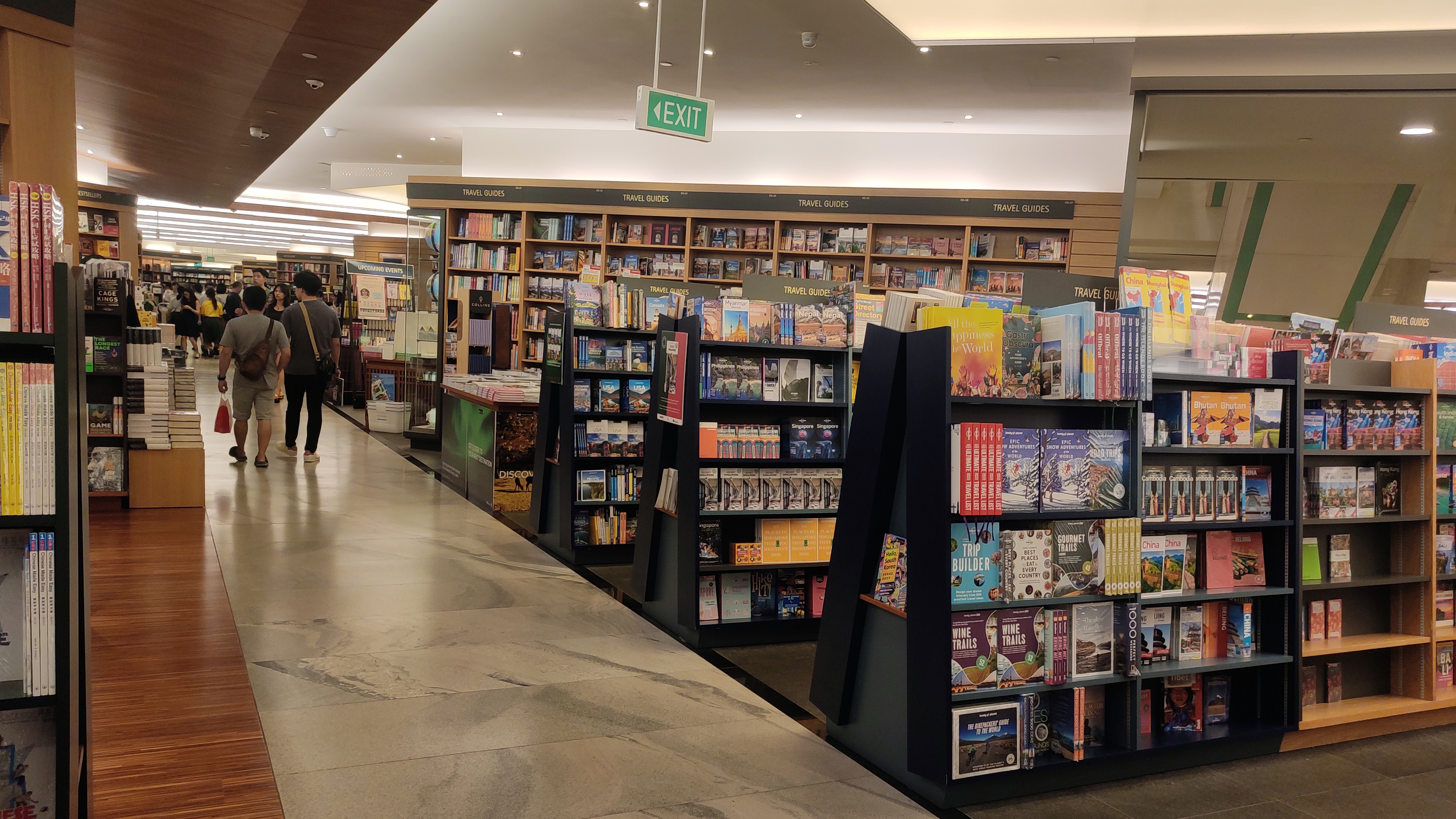
Books Kinokuniya store located in Ngee Ann City, Orchard Road, Singapore

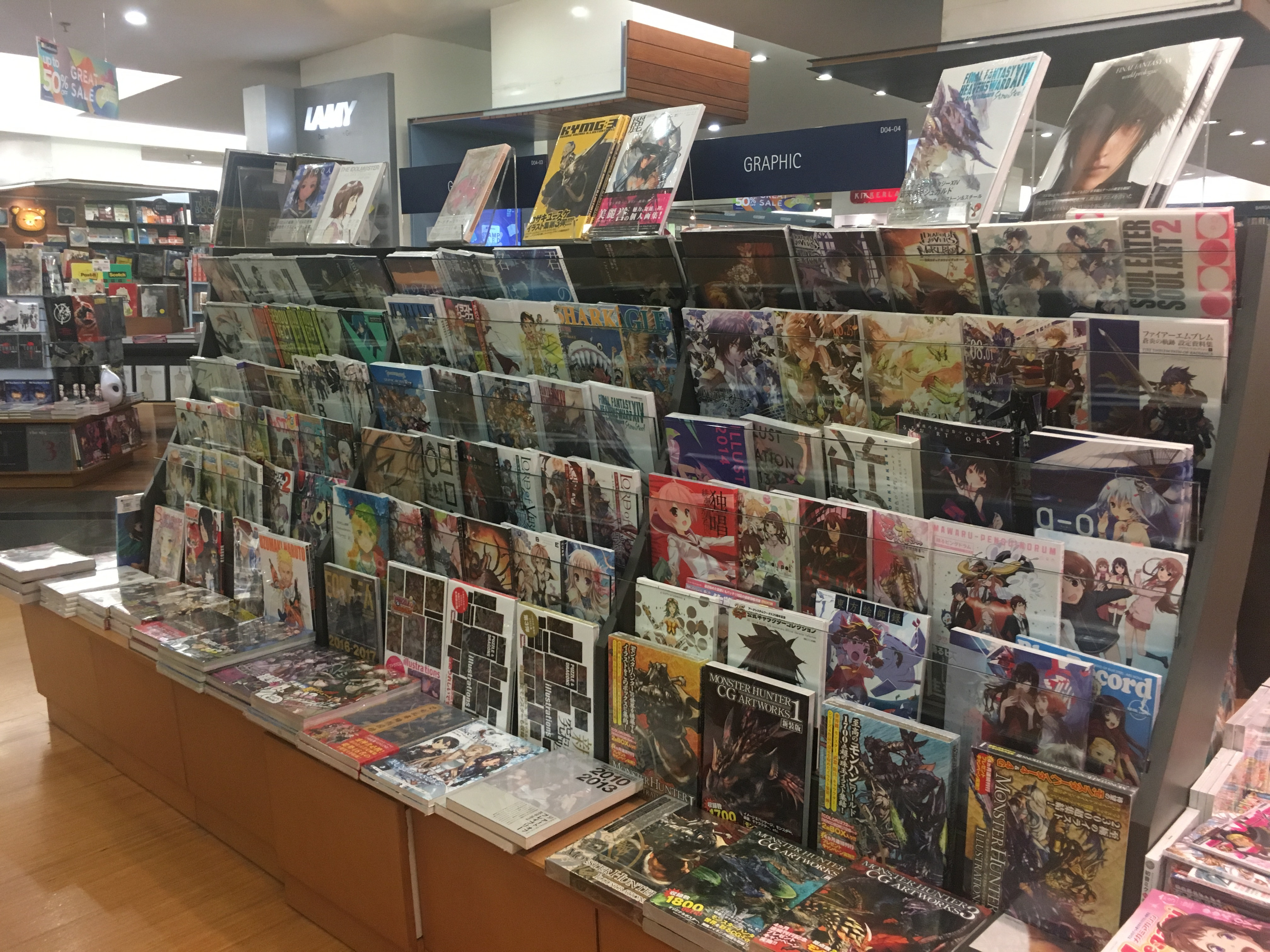
Books Kinokuniya store located in Sogo Pondok Indah Mall, Jakarta

Overseas, there are 44 stores in total as of January 2025. They are located in:

- Australia
  - The Galeries, Sydney, New South Wales
  - Westfield Chatswood, Sydney, New South Wales
  - Melbourne Central Shopping Centre, Melbourne, Victoria
- Bangladesh
  - Centrepoint, Dhaka
- Cambodia
  - AEON Mall Sen Sok, Phnom Penh
- Hong Kong
  - Harbour City, Tsim Sha Tsui, Hong Kong
  - Mira Place, Tsim Sha Tsui, Hong Kong
  - Grand Plaza, Mong Kok, Hong Kong
  - Lee Theatre, Causeway Bay, Hong Kong
  - Tuen Mun Town Plaza, Tuen Mun, Hong Kong (store closed on August 21, 2023)
  - Island Resort Mall, Siu Sai Wan, Hong Kong (opened September 22, 2025)
- Indonesia
  - Central Market PIK 2, Jakarta
  - Sogo Central Park, Jakarta
  - Sogo Plaza Senayan, Jakarta (store closed on April 1, 2021; reopened in December 2024)
  - Seibu Grand Indonesia, Jakarta
  - Kota Kasablanka, Jakarta
  - Sira Village Grand Outlet, Bali
- Malaysia
  - Suria KLCC, Kuala Lumpur
  - Seibu The Exchange TRX, Kuala Lumpur
  - Pavilion Damansara Heights, Kuala Lumpur
- Philippines (In partnership with local bookstore chain Fully Booked, where they are known as "Fully Booked-Kinokuniya", which are a bit different from the regular Fully Booked bookstores)
  - Mitsukoshi BGC, Bonifacio Global City, Taguig (store opened on November 17, 2022)
  - SM Mall of Asia, Pasay
  - SM North EDSA, Quezon City
  - Glorietta 4, Makati City
  - SM City Cebu, Cebu City
- Singapore
  - Ngee Ann City, Orchard Road
  - Bugis Junction, Bugis
  - Liang Court, Clarke Quay (store closed on April 21, 2019)
  - JEM, Jurong East (store closed on May 9, 2022)
  - Raffles City, Singapore (opened on 18 July 2025)
- Taiwan
  - Breeze Center, Taipei
  - Dayeh Takashimaya Department Store, Tianmu, Taipei (closed March 2022)
  - Kuan San Sogo, Taichung
  - Hanshin Arena Shopping Plaza, Kaohsiung
- Thailand
  - CentralWorld, Bangkok (Former Isetan Zone; Isetan Department Store closed on August 31, 2020, while Kinokuniya Bookstore still open as usual)
  - Siam Paragon, Bangkok
  - EmQuartier, Bangkok (Relocated from Emporium)
- United Arab Emirates
  - Dubai, Dubai Mall - It is advertised under the title 'Book World by Kinokuniya'.
  - Abu Dhabi, The Galleria, Al Maryah Island
- United States
  - Little Tokyo, Los Angeles, California
  - Japantown, San Francisco, California
  - San Jose, California
  - Santa Monica, California
  - Torrance, California
  - Arcadia, California
  - Johns Creek, Georgia
  - Arlington Heights, Illinois
  - Edgewater, New Jersey
  - New York City, New York
  - Beaverton, Oregon
  - Portland, Oregon
  - Austin, Texas
  - Carrollton, Texas
  - Haltom City, Texas (marketed as Fort Worth)
  - Katy, Texas
  - Plano, Texas
  - Seattle, Washington
