= Internet censorship in Hong Kong =

Although Hong Kong law provides freedom of speech and press, and freedom of expression is protected by the Hong Kong Bill of Rights, the Hong Kong national security law gives the government the power to "take down any electronic messages published" that the government considers endangering national security (see Hong Kong national security law). The government has blocked several anti-government, doxxing or politically sensitive websites after the commencement of the law (see blockages after 30 June 2020), leading to increased concerns of Internet censorship.

Government licences are not required to operate a website. There is some monitoring of the Internet. Democratic activists claim central government authorities closely monitor their e-mails and Internet use.

== History and law ==
Hong Kong is a Special Administrative Region (SAR) of the People's Republic of China (PRC). The 1984 Sino-British Joint Declaration on the Question of Hong Kong and the SAR's charter, the Basic Law of the SAR, specified that Hong Kong will enjoy a high degree of autonomy except in matters of defence and foreign affairs. Chapter III of the Basic Law outlines "Fundamental Rights and Duties of the Residents" including freedom of expression and association and privacy rights. The Hong Kong Bill of Rights elaborates on these and other rights enjoyed by the people of Hong Kong.

The Hong Kong government enacted the Hong Kong national security law on 30 June 2020. Under its Article 43, local law enforcement unit was authorized to censor any resources when handling cases concerning offense endangering national security.

=== Computer crime ordinances ===
"Section 161: Access to computer with criminal or dishonest intent" of the Crimes Ordinance (Cap 200) which was enacted in 1993 before the widespread use the Internet and the growth of e-commerce generally, provides that it is an offence to obtain access to a computer:

- with an intent to commit an offence;
- with a dishonest intent to deceive;
- with a view to gain for oneself or another;
- or with a dishonest intent to cause loss to another.

Conviction upon indictment of any of these offences carries a maximum punishment of five years.

Section 27A of the Telecommunications Ordinance (Cap 106) enacted in 2000 provides that "any person who, by telecommunications, knowingly causes a computer to perform any function to obtain unauthorized access to any program or data held in a computer commits an offense and is liable on conviction to a fine of HK$20000".

=== Pornography ===
Pursuant to the Control of Obscene and Indecent Articles Ordinance (Cap 390), it is an offence to publish an obscene article. Publication covers distribution, circulation, selling, hiring, giving, or lending the obscene article. Distribution by e-mail falls within the definition of distribution, as does the placing of an obscene article on a website. Distribution does not require any element of financial gain. The definition includes "anything consisting of or containing material to be read or looked at or both read and looked at, any sound recording, and any film, video-tape, disc, or other record of a picture or pictures". An article will be considered obscene if, by reason by its obscenity, "it is not suitable to be published to any person". Obscenity includes "violence, depravity, and repulsiveness". The penalty for this offence is up to three years imprisonment and a fine of up to HK$1,000,000.

It is an offence to possess, produce, copy, import, or export pornography involving a child under 18 years of age, or to publish or cause to be published any advertisement that conveys or is likely to be understood as conveying the message that any person has published, publishes, or intends to publish any child pornography. The penalty for creation, publication, or advertisement of child pornography is eight years’ imprisonment, while possession carries a penalty of five years’ imprisonment.

=== Copyright ===
The Copyright Ordinance (Chapter 528) provides the legal framework for copyright protection in Hong Kong. In April 2011 the government introduced the Copyright (Amendments) Bill 2011 that, if passed, will introduce (i) a new technology-neutral exclusive right for copyright owners to communicate their works through any mode of electronic transmission, with criminal sanctions against those who make unauthorised communication of copyright works to the public; (ii) safe harbour provisions for online service providers; and (iii) additional factors to consider by the courts when awarding additional damages for copyright infringement.

There are complaints that the proposed amendments prohibiting unauthorised use of copyright material in any medium without permission threatens freedom of speech. The bill may negatively affect works of satire or parody on the Internet because there is no "fair-use exception". The government's position is that the amendments strengthen intellectual property rights. Some pan-democratic activists and supporters termed the bill an "Internet Article 23" (a reference to Hong Kong Basic Law Article 23, controversial anti-subversion measures the government proposed in 2002 that led to Hong Kong's largest-ever street demonstrations, the proposed article was withdrawn in September 2003, and then re-introduced and passed in March 2024).

=== Hong Kong national security law ===
Article 43 of Hong Kong national security law states that platforms, publishers, and Internet service providers (ISPs) may be ordered to take down electronic messages published that are "likely to constitute an offence endangering national security or is likely to cause the occurrence of an offence endangering national security". Individuals, organizations, and companies who do not comply with such requests could face fines of up to 100,000 HKD (US$12,903) and put into prison for six months.

The Hong Kong chief executive may authorize the police to intercept communications and conduct surveillance to “prevent and detect offences endangering national security".

== Self-censorship ==
There are reports of media self-censorship since most media outlets are owned by businesses with interests on the mainland, causing authors and editors to defer to the perceived concerns of publishers regarding their business interests. Some scholars suggest that Hong Kong-based academics practice some self-censorship in their China-related work to preserve good relations and research and lecturing opportunities in the mainland.

In a poll published in June 2012 by the Hong Kong Journalists Association, 86.9% of the 663 journalists surveyed felt that press freedom had deteriorated in the past seven years. This is a 28.5% increase from a similar survey in 2007. Those who felt freedom had declined attributed the change to: tighter government control (92%), self-censorship in the industry (71%), interference from Beijing (67.5%), and pressure from the business sector (35.9%). According to respondents the policies that most affect the decline in freedom are: Spot news information being controlled by the police and the Fire Services Department (57%); releasing more official footage and articles and fewer news events being accessible to reporters (41.3); off-the-record briefings increasing tremendously (23.8); and a government proposal to criminalise stalking (16%).

=== TikTok ===
Almost immediately after the implementation of the Hong Kong National Security Law in July 2020, TikTok ceased its operation in Hong Kong and replaced the option for Hong Kong users with Douyin, the strictly censored mainland Chinese version of the app by ByteDance. Users reported issues when using Hong Kong registered SIM cards even though they have connected to a VPN service, which indicates that TikTok used their users' SIM card information to block access from the territory.

== Instances of censorship ==
=== Before 30 June 2020 ===
==== Local ISP shutdown – March 1995 ====
In March 1995, Royal Hong Kong Police raided all but one of the pioneering local ISP offering dialup service, confiscated their servers and records and shut them down for a week, blocking the access of 5000 to 8000 of Hong Kong's early Internet adopters. The raids were thought to be instigated by Supernet, the one ISP not shut down, and coordinated by the Office of Telecommunications Authority (OFTA) working with the Commercial Crime Bureau (CCB) on the premise that the ISPs were operating without applying for a then-obscure Public Non-Exclusive Telecommunications Service (PNETS) Licence. The companies shut down were Hong Kong Internet & Gateway Services (HKIGS) hk.net, Hong Kong Link InfoLink Ilink, Internet Online Hong Kong, Cybernet, Internet Connections, and Asia Online.

==== Edison Chen photo scandal – January 2008 ====
In January and February 2008, the Hong Kong Police Force arrested ten people who were accused of obtaining, uploading, or distributing pornographic images after Emperor Entertainment Group (EEG), a multi-billion entertainment company, filed a complaint about the availability of the photos on the Internet. The images in question, which were explicit in nature, were of the Hong Kong actor Edison Chen engaging in sex acts with various women, several of whom were local actresses. Chen admitted being the author and copyright owner of most of the photographs, and stated that the private photographs had been stolen and published illegally without his consent. A computer technician was convicted of three counts of obtaining access to a computer with dishonest intent, and received a custodial sentence of eight and a half months.

The scandal shook the Hong Kong entertainment industry and received high-profile media attention locally and around the world. The police met with more than 200 people responsible for major Hong Kong websites and BBS communities to urge them to delete the pictures "as they have the responsibility to stop crimes". Related discussion threads were progressively deleted. The police ordered several locally registered websites and BBS management firms to submit information about their clients, and had retrieved the IP addresses of more than 30 Internet users who allegedly posted photographs. The police crackdown raised questions over violations of the privacy and free speech rights of Internet users and the selective application of the law.

=== After 30 June 2020 ===
Article 43 of the Hong Kong national security law, which came into force on 30 June 2020, authorized the police to order "a person who published information or the relevant service provider to delete the information or provide assistance." (see Hong Kong national security law) Since then, the Hong Kong government has been blocking several anti-government or politically sensitive sites. (see below)

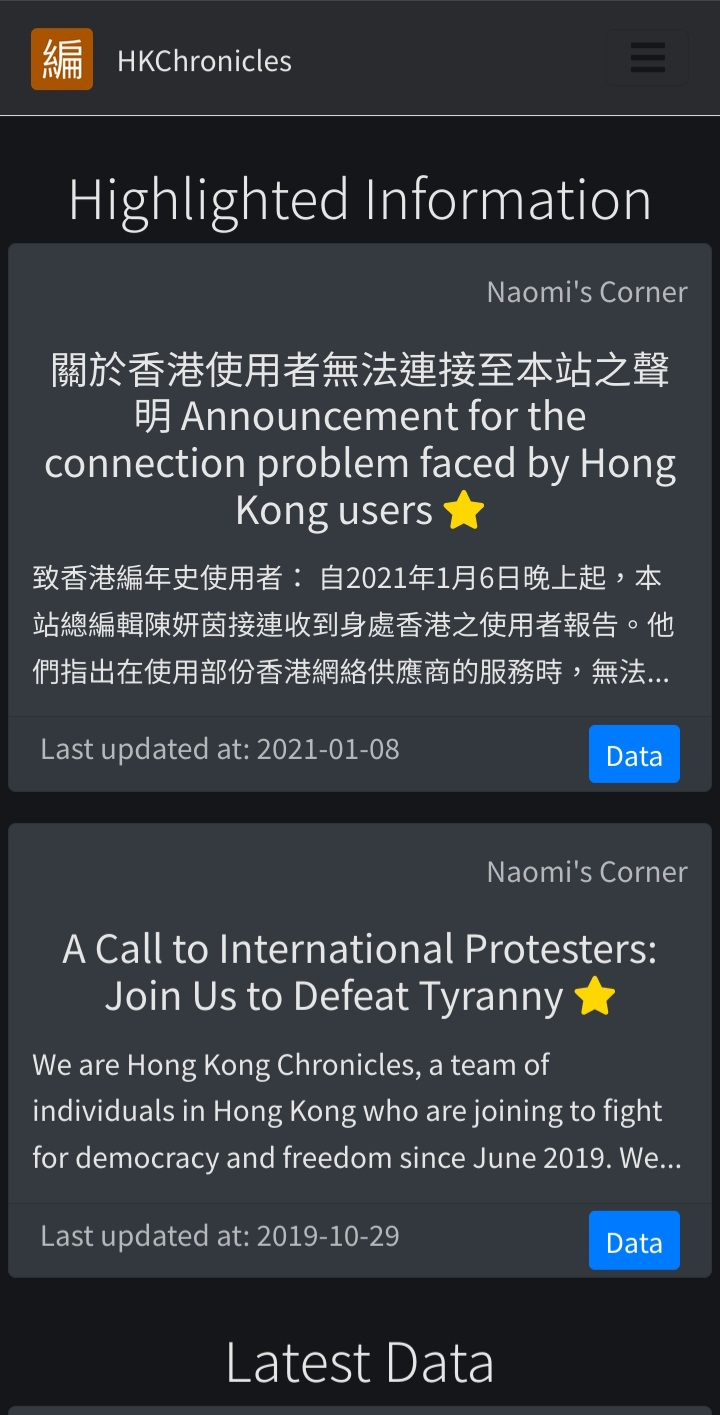
Screenshot of HKChronicles on 29 April 2021

Hong Kong ISPs generally block websites in their home broadband and mobile data networks, and most public Wi-Fi networks are also affected. However, most providers do not implement blocking arrangements when offering enterprise networks.

==== HKChronicles - January 2021 ====
HKChronicles is a wiki-like website that details the personal information of Hong Kong police officers and pro-Beijing individuals for doxxing purposes. On 7 January 2021, the website's owner Naomi announced on the website that she had received reports from users in Hong Kong that the website was inaccessible when using certain local ISP. Several local news reporters confirmed that the site could not be accessed within the city. The police declined to comment on the blockage. However, in a statement, they said they "can require service providers to take restrictive actions against messages posted on digital platforms, which likely constitute the offense of endangering national security or incite a national security offense." Hong Kong Broadband Network, one of the biggest mobile telecom companies in Hong Kong, said they have disabled access to the website in compliance with the requirement issued under the National Security Law on 13 January 2021.

==== Transitional Justice Commission - February 2021 ====
On 13 February 2021, Hong Kong netizens reported that the website of Taiwan's Transitional Justice Commission cannot be accessed from Hong Kong. Some local medias confirmed that they couldn't access the site without using a Virtual Private Network (VPN). The police refused to comment on the blockage.

==== Block of Taiwanese sites - April 2021 ====
On 24 April 2021, some netizens discovered that they could not enter the website of Presbyterian Church in Taiwan (www.pct.gov.tw). Later, they reported that the official website of Democratic Progressive Party (www.dpp.org.tw) and Recruitment Centre of National Armed Force (https://www.rdrc.mnd.gov.tw) also could not be accessed from Hong Kong. Some local news medias confirmed. The police refused to comment.

By 27 April 2021, the Stand News retested the three websites and found out that the websites of Presbyterian Church in Taiwan and Democratic Progressive Party are now accessible. However, they still couldn't establish a connection to the official site of Recruitment Centre of National Armed Force.

==== 2021 Hong Kong Charter - June 2021 ====
Since 18 June 2021, some local ISP users reported they could not browse the website of 2021 Hong Kong Charter (2021hkcharter.com). Sources said local ISP received order from the police and prevented users from accessing the website from 18 June. Initiators of the website said it was blocked on 19 June. Police refused to comment.

==== June 4th Incident Online Museum - Sep 2021 ====
On 28 September 2021, Stand News reported the website of June 4th Incident Online Museum (8964museum.com) was likely blocked.

==== Hong Kong Watch Website ====
On 15 February 2022, several ISPs in Hong Kong were reported to be blocking the website of a U.K.-based group Hong Kong Watch.

==== Flow HK ====
In October 2024, Flow HK received a take down demand from Hong Kong police.

== List of websites blocked ==
| Website | URL | Category | Language(s) | Duration of blockage | Methodology | Current Status |
|---|---|---|---|---|---|---|
| HKChronicles | hkchronicles.com; hkleaks.info; blockedbyhk.com; goodhope.school | Doxing website | Chinese (Traditional), English | 7 January 2021 – | TCP/IP blocking; DNS tampering | Blocked |
| Transitional Justice Commission | www.tjc.gov.tw; twtjcdb.tjc.gov.tw | Governmental | Chinese (Traditional) | 13 – 20 February 2021 | HTTP blocking | Unblocked, the commission was dissolved, and the website was closed. |
| Presbyterian Church in Taiwan | www.pct.org.tw | Church | Chinese (Traditional) | 24 – 27 April 2021 | TCP/IP blocking | Unblocked |
| Democratic Progressive Party | www.dpp.org.tw | Political organization | Chinese (Traditional) | 24 – 27 April 2021 | Unknown | Unblocked |
| 2021 Hong Kong Charter | 2021hkcharter.com | Politics | English, Chinese (Traditional) | 18/19 June 2021 – | TCP/IP blocking | Blocked despite closed |
| June 4 Incident Online Museum | 8964museum.com | Politics | Chinese (Traditional) | 28 Sep 2021 - | TCP/IP blocking | Blocked |
| Hong Kong Watch | www.hongkongwatch.org | Politics | English | 14 Feb 2022 – ? | DNS Tampering | Blocked |
| Hong Kong Democracy Council | www.hkdc.us | Politics | English | 26 October 2022 – ? | DNS Tampering | Blocked |
| Flow HK | flowhongkong.net/ | Blog and News | Chinese | 6 October – | DNS tampering | Blocked |
| Hong Kong Parliament Electoral Organizing Committee | www.hkparliament.org | Politics | | Since at least July 2025 | | Blocked |

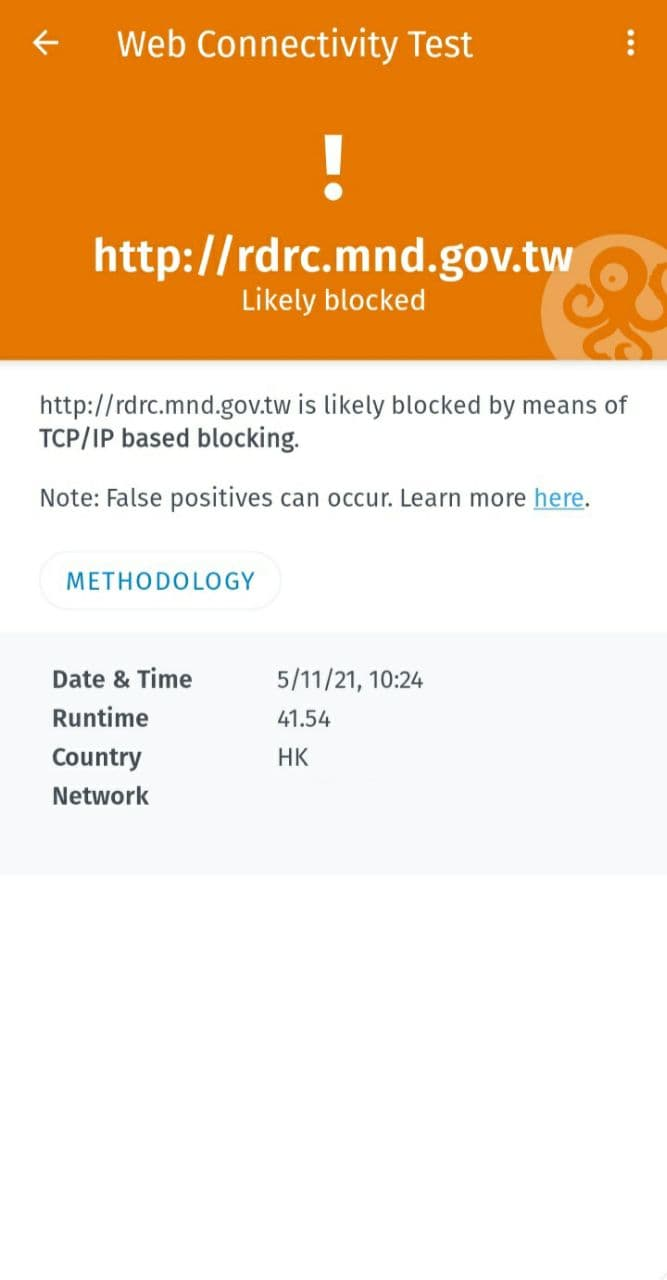
Screenshot of OONI probe app stating that rdrc.mnd.gov.tw is likely blocked by TCP/IP based blocking.

== See also ==
- Censorship in Hong Kong
- Communications in Hong Kong
- Politics of Hong Kong
