= Glacier Kwong =

Hong Kong political activist (born 1996)

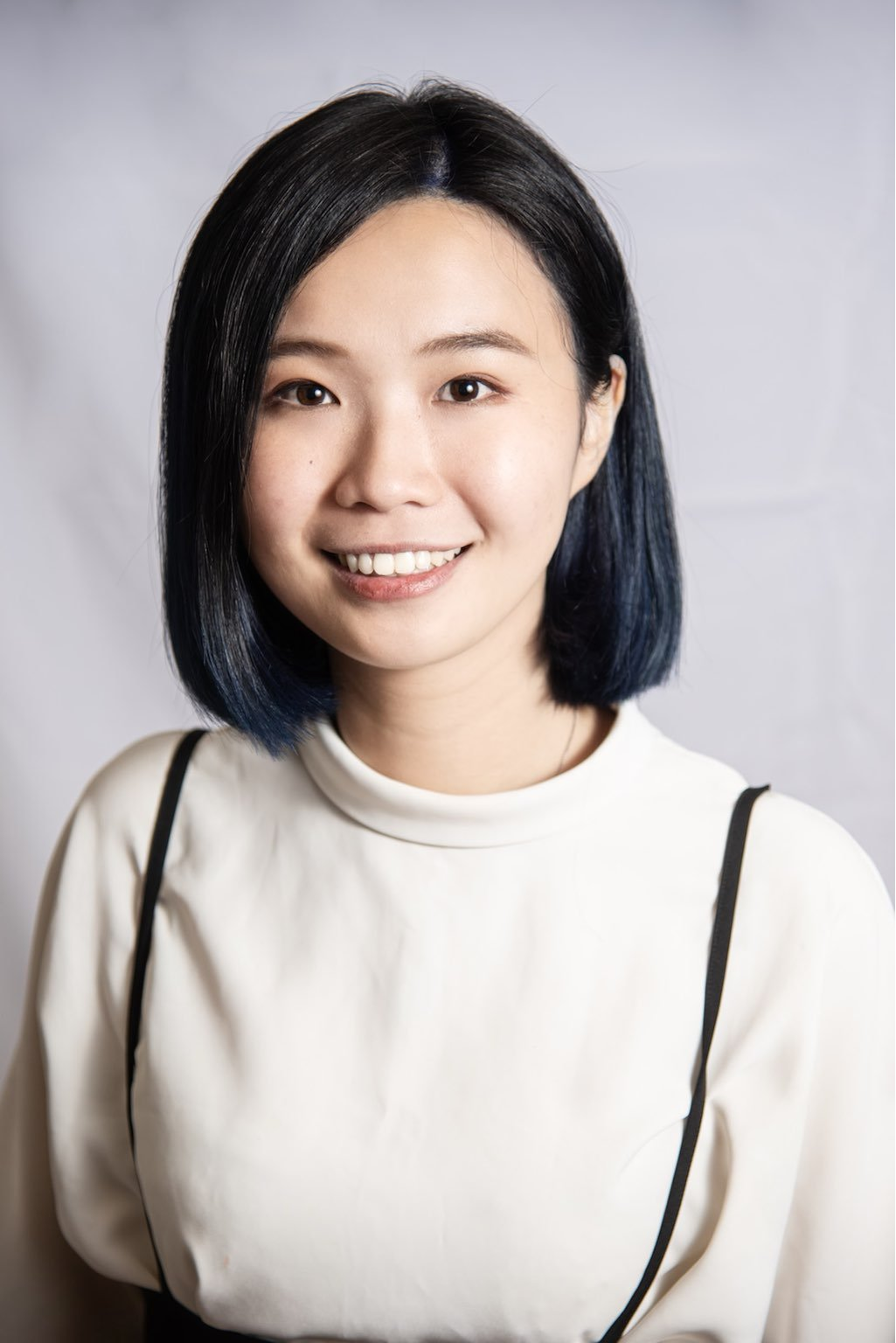
- Kwong in 2021
- Born: 11 July 1996 (age 30); Hong Kong
- Education: University of Hong Kong; University of Hamburg
- Occupations: Hong Kong Campaigns Coordinator, Inter-Parliamentary Alliance on China

Chinese name
- Traditional Chinese: 鄺頌晴
- Simplified Chinese: 邝颂晴
Transcriptions
Standard Mandarin
- Hanyu Pinyin: Kuàng Sòngqíng
Yue: Cantonese
- Jyutping: kwong3 zung6 cing4

Chung Ching 'Glacier' Kwong (Chinese: 鄺頌晴, born 11 July 1996) is a political activist from Hong Kong. She is a PhD candidate in law at the University of Hamburg. She is also currently the Hong Kong Campaigns Coordinator at Inter-Parliamentary Alliance on China. She was previously the Digital Rights Research Fellow at Hong Kong Democracy Council (HKDC), a leading organization for the pro-democracy movement in Hong Kong and Hong Kongers overseas led by fellow activist Samuel Chu. Back in the days in Hong Kong, she was the spokesperson of the non-governmental organization (NGO) Keyboard Frontline, monitoring privacy abuses and censorship on the web.

Following the enactment of the Hong Kong national security law in 2020, Kwong is living in self-imposed exile in Germany. She is now located in London.

== Biography ==
=== Student political activities ===
While she was a student at the University of Hong Kong, Kwong participated in the "Umbrella Revolution", the non-violent protest that took place in Hong Kong from September to December 2014. Her family, parents, and sister knew she was attending the protest and did not restrict her from the demonstrations, but when the Parliament of the United Kingdom invited her for an interview about the protests, her parents would not give her her passport to travel, stating that it was "very political".

Kwong recorded a short video calling for international support and assistance for Hong Kong during the Umbrella Revolution and uploaded it to social media. The video clip gathered over a million views.

Glacier Kwong also supported the movement Youngspiration, created after the end of the Umbrella Revolution to fight for seats in the Legislation Council's elections.

=== Hong Kong Democracy Council ===
In January 2021, Kwong joined the Hong Kong Democracy Council (HKDC) as a research fellow focusing on digital rights.

=== Keyboard Frontline ===
Kwong was the spokesperson of the NGO Keyboard Frontline, where she advocated for human rights on the web. Her interests included personal securities, for example, she said in an interview in 2019, that radio frequency identification (RFID) scanners can trace different personal devices like a mobile phone or credit cards, so your privacy may be abused by illegal observers.

=== Trip for international support of Hong Kong pro-democracy movement ===
Kwong accompanied Joshua Wong in his foreign travel to build support for the Hong Kong pro-democracy movement as well as explain the causes of massive demonstrations in Hong Kong in 2019. She said in a press conference in Berlin that she asked German and European Union governments to stop supplying police equipment to Hong Kong because all have to observe human rights.

=== Exile in Germany ===
Kwong moved to Hamburg, Germany in 2018 to study for a master's degree there. Kwong worked with the German group "Wir für Hongkong" to lobby the Bundestag to sanction China. As a result, Kwong has received threats and says she would be arrested upon arrival in Hong Kong under the new national security law.

Kwong was one of the self-exiled Hong Kongers who in March 2021 launched the 2021 Hong Kong Charter, a declaration of the Hong Kong diaspora's political and cultural aspirations.

In July 2021, Kwong and other exiled Hong Kongers participated in a panel hosted by the United Nations Human Rights Council. They highlighted the effect of the national security law in Hong Kong, citing the forced closure of the Apple Daily newspaper, and called on UN officials to take action.

== Publications ==
- 'Too terrified to travel': A new normal for Hong Kong's 'Occupy Generation'? Special to CNN; February 26, 2015
