= The Galeries =

Shopping centre in Sydney, Australia

Coordinates: 33.872767°S 151.207237°E

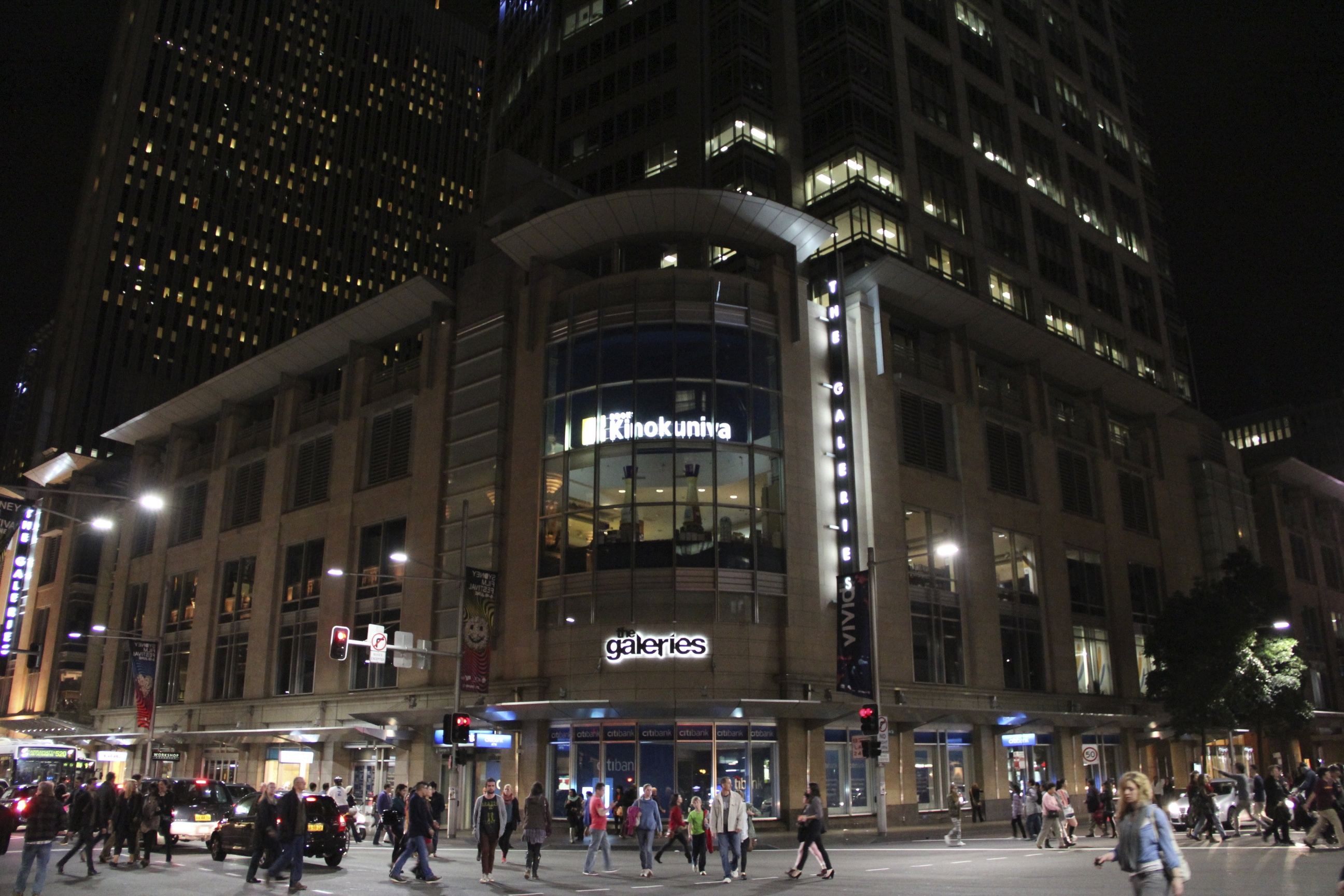
The Galeries shopping centre by night, from the corner of Park and George streets

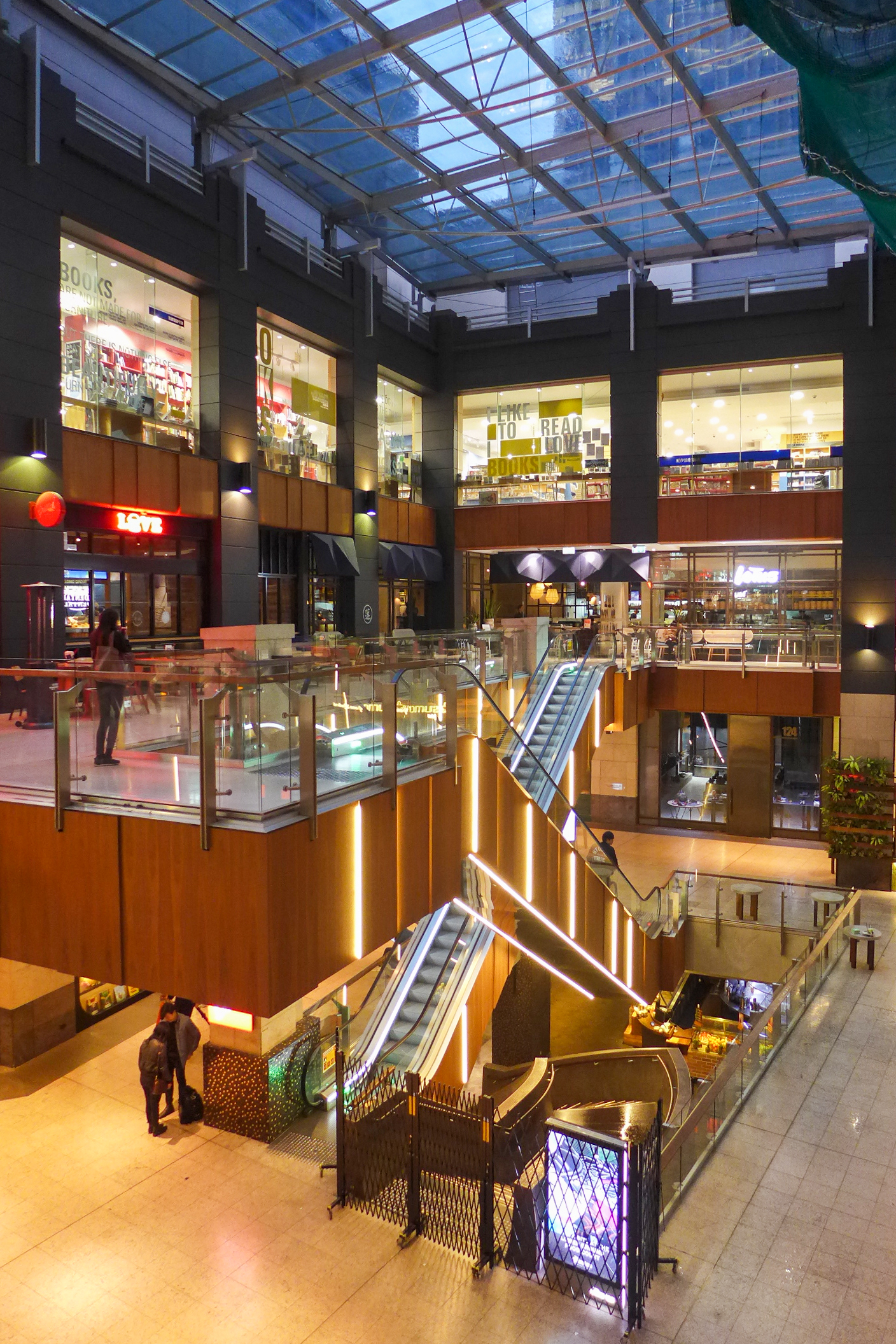
The Galeries Atrium in 2017

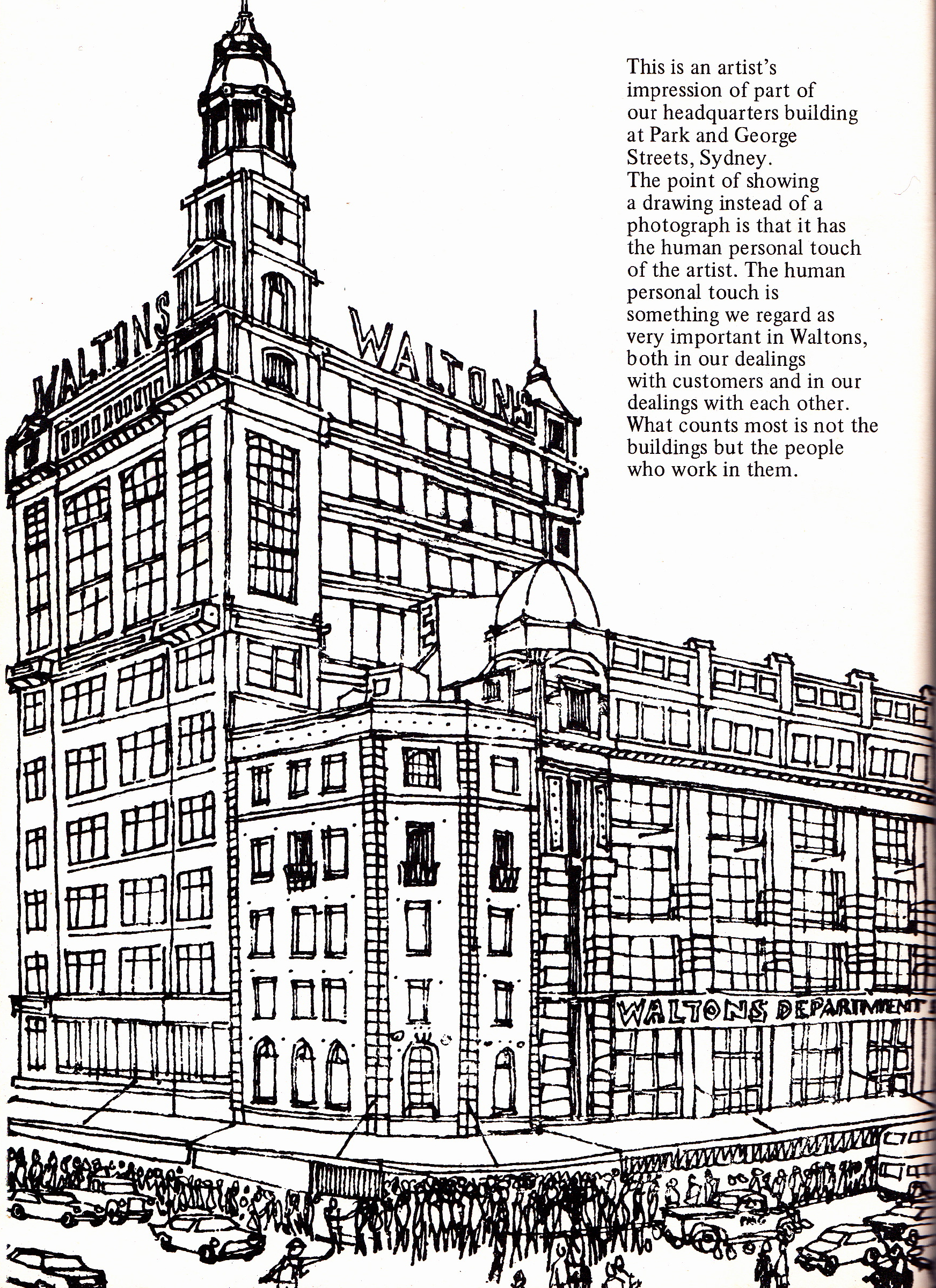
Waltons Department Store, on the corner of Park and George streets

The Galeries is a shopping centre in Sydney, New South Wales, Australia. It was formerly known as The Galeries Victoria until renamed in early 2013. It is located in the heart of the Sydney central business district, bounded by George, Pitt and Park Streets. The shopping centre sits below the Citigroup Centre office tower and beside the Sydney Hilton Hotel.

== History ==
The site on which The Galeries now stands was originally the Murdoch's Ltd. department store, later the flagship Waltons department store. The Waltons store was demolished in 1983, and the site sat vacant for years after the owner Alan Bond suffered major losses from the investment in Waltons.

The new development, incorporating the high-rise Citigroup Centre and the Galeries Victoria as a podium, was completed in 2000.

== Description ==
The Galeries is a four-level shopping centre that features a series of covered laneways running throughout with bridges between buildings and a central piazza area. The centre also incorporates the historic Sydney Mechanics' School of Arts, which is now the Arthouse Hotel.

The centre includes direct access to Town Hall railway station via underground passageways at the southern end, adjacent to a passageway that leads to the Queen Victoria Building. A station on the Sydney Monorail was also incorporated into the centre until the monorail closed in 2013.

The Citigroup Centre and combined Galeries was designed by Crone Partners Architecture Studios.

== See also ==
- Architecture of Sydney
