= 2021 Hong Kong Charter =

Cultural and political charter

- 2021 Hong Kong Charter
- Founder: Nathan Law, Ted Hui, Baggio Leung, Sunny Cheung, Ray Wong, Brian Leung, Glacier Kwong, Alex Chow
- Official language: English, Traditional Chinese
- Website: 2021hkcharter.com

2021 Hong Kong Charter is a political charter initiated by Hong Kong activists and politicians Nathan Law, Ted Hui, Baggio Leung, Sunny Cheung, Ray Wong, Brian Leung, Glacier Kwong, and Alex Chow, who went into self-exile abroad after Hong Kong national security law became effective. Its purpose is to unite Hongkongers around the world.

Numerous overseas Hong Kong groups and individuals are signatories of the charter.

== Charter ==
The charter is divided into four parts, namely "The belief of the Diasporic Hongkongers", "Hong Kong", "China", and "The World". The signatories are mainly Hongkongers living overseas

== Removal by Wix ==
In late May to early June, 2021, Hong Kong police requested Wix, the then-service provider of 2021 Hong Kong Charter's website, to take down the site on the grounds of violating the Hong Kong national security law. It went offline shortly after. On 3 June, Wix replied and apologized on Twitter that 2021 Hong Kong Charter was mistakenly removed and had returned normal.

== Blockage in Hong Kong ==
Since 18 June 2021, some local ISP users reported they could not browse the website of 2021 Hong Kong Charter. Sources said local ISP received order from the police and prevented users from accessing the website from 18 June. Initiators of the website said it was blocked on 19 June. Police refused to comment.

== Controversies ==
The security bureau of Hong Kong said Hong Kong national security law is applicable overseas. Initiators of the charter would still be arrested if they violate the law.
