= HKChronicles =

Doxing website

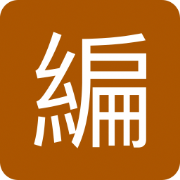
- Available in: Chinese (Traditional), English
- Owner: Naomi Chan
- Website: hkchronicles.com hkleaks.info blockedbyhk.com goodhope.school
- Commercial: No

HKChronicles (Chinese: 香港編年史) is a pro-Hong Kong democracy doxing website which details the personal information of Hong Kong police officers and pro-Beijing individuals. It was created by Naomi Chan, an 18-year-old high school student who is also the chief editor of the site.

== Data ==
There are various data listed in HKChronicles:

- Pro-democracy articles
- Documents allegations of excessive police force
- Personal information of pro-Beijing individuals and police, including mobile phone numbers and pictures (updated regularly)
- "Yellow" shops which supported the pro-democracy movement

== Blockage in Hong Kong ==
On January 7, 2021, the website owner, Naomi Chan said she has received reports from users in Hong Kong that the website was inaccessible when using certain local Internet Service Providers (ISP), including Smartone, CMHK, and PCCW. Several local news reporters confirmed that the site couldn't be accessed within the city.

The Hong Kong police refused to comment on the blockage. However, in a statement, they said they "could require service providers to take restrictive actions against messages posted on digital platforms, which likely constitute the offense of endangering national security or incite a national security offense."

Hong Kong Broadband Network, one of the biggest mobile telecom companies in Hong Kong, said they have disabled access to the website to comply with the requirement issued under the Hong Kong National Security Law on 13 January 2021.

South China Morning Post reported that the Hong Kong Police Force has cited Article 43 of the Hong Kong National Security law to block HKChronicles according to an unnamed source. It is believed that the site has been permanently blocked by citing the article.

=== Block methods ===
Most of the ISPs used a method of IP blocking in early January 2021. However, this blocked hundreds of unrelated websites as the website was routing its traffic through CloudFlare, thus sharing the same IP addresses with the affected websites. Later, it was reported that ISPs changed to DNS poisoning. HKChronicles said users might be able to circumvent the blockage by changing their DNS addresses to that of Google's or Cloudflare's, though it recommends using a VPN.

== Blockage in Macau ==
In March 2021, some Macau citizens reported that the site couldn't be reached.

== See also ==
- Internet censorship in Hong Kong
- Internet censorship in China
- 2019-2020 Hong Kong protests
