= Grand Plaza =

Building in Hong Kong

- 雅蘭中心
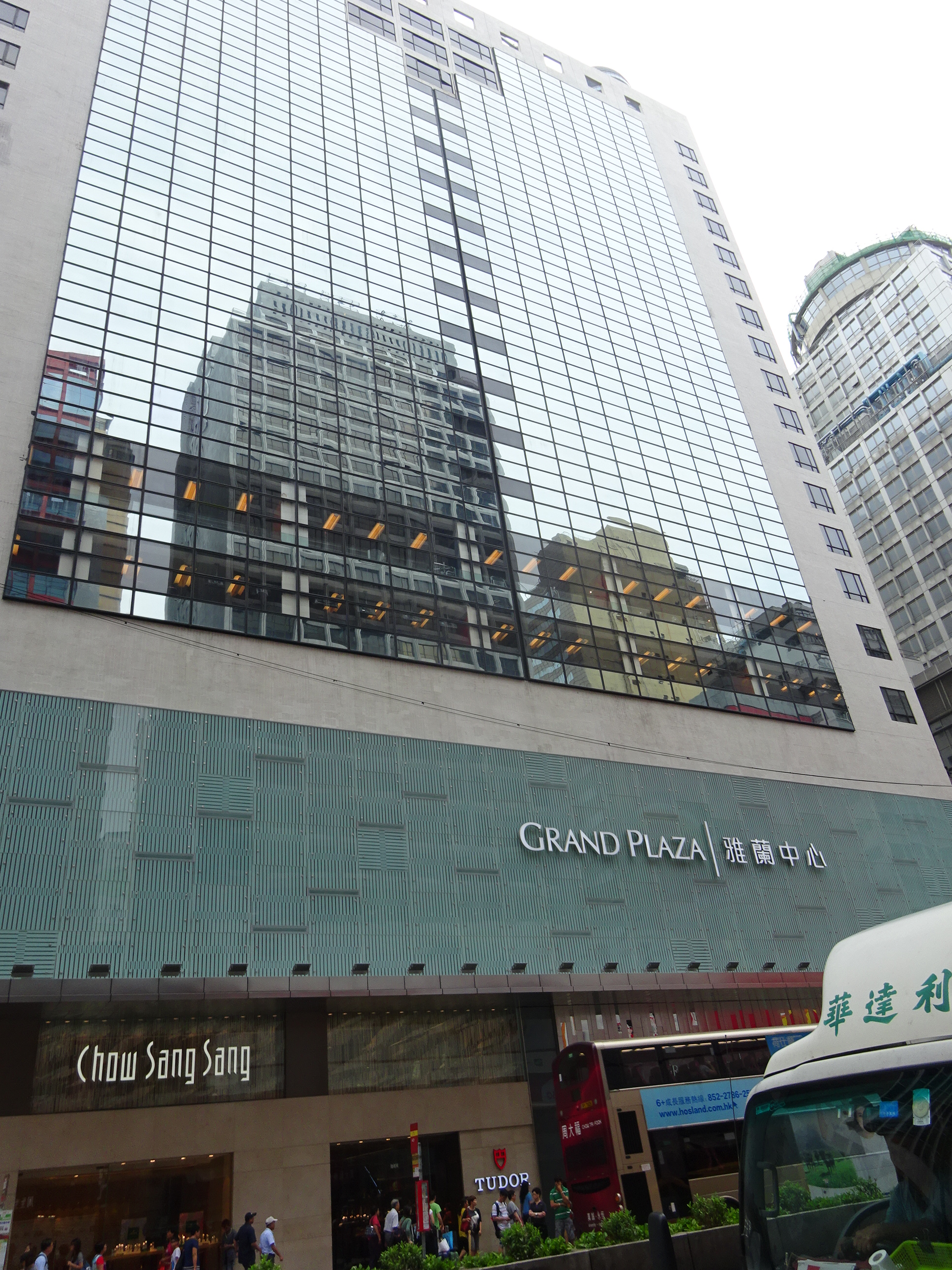
- The building's exterior, 2015
- Interactive map of the Grand Plaza area
- Alternative names: Grand Tower

General information
- Location: Mong Kok, Kowloon, Hong Kong
- Coordinates: 22.317799°N 114.169438°E

Grand Plaza (Chinese: 雅蘭中心), also known as Grand Tower, is a building in Mong Kok, Kowloon, Hong Kong.
