= Cheng Yu-tung Family =

Hong Kong-based family

The Cheng Yu-tung Family refers to a wealthy Hong Kong–based family best known for controlling Chow Tai Fook, via which it also owns New World Development and Rosewood Hotel Group, among other businesses.

The businesses are currently being led by Adrian Cheng, the third-generation, and has been called by Citigroup research as being "brave and innovative" among other scions in Hong Kong.

== Notable family members ==
- Cheng Yu-tung (1925–2018); founder of Chow Tai Fook
  - Henry Cheng (b. 1946); chairman of New World Development
    - Adrian Cheng (b. 1979); CEO of New World Development
    - Sonia Cheng (b. 1980); CEO of Rosewood Hotel Group
    - Brian Cheng (b. 1982); co-CEO of NWS Holdings
    - Christopher Cheng (b. 1989); CEO of NWS Modern Logistics Limited
  - Peter Cheng (b. 1952)
    - Conroy Cheng (b. 1977)
    - Conrad Cheng (b. 1979)

== Charity ==
Since 2019, New World has been involved in donating land to build public housing in Hong Kong.

== Businesses ==
- Chow Tai Fook
- New World Development
- NWS Holdings
- Rosewood Hotel Group (parent company of Rosewood Hotels & Resorts)
