= Rosewood Hotel Group =

Privately owned hotel chain

- Formerly: New World Hotel Group; New World Hospitality; New World Hotel Management
- Type: Subsidiary
- Industry: Hospitality
- Predecessor: New World Hotels International Limited; Hotel management division of New World Development
- Founded: 2005; 21 years ago in Hong Kong
- Founder: New World China Land
Headquarters
| British Virgin Islands | (registered office) |
| Hong Kong | (de facto) |
- Area served: Worldwide
- Key people: Sonia Cheng (CEO)
- Brands: New World; Rosewood; Carlyle & Co.; Asaya, A Rosewood Spa; KHOS (2017-2023, renamed to New World Hotels & Resorts)
- Services: Hotel management
- Total equity: HK$1.934 billion (31 March 2015)
- Parent: Chow Tai Fook Enterprises
- Subsidiaries: New World Hotels & Resorts; Rosewood Hotels & Resorts

Chinese name
- Traditional Chinese: 瑰麗酒店集團
- Simplified Chinese: 瑰丽酒店集团
- Literal meaning: exceptionally beautiful hotel group
Transcriptions
- Website: rosewoodhotelgroup.com
- Footnotes source of financial data

Rosewood Hotel Group, also known for its former trading names New World Hotel Group, New World Hospitality and legal names New World Hotel Management (BVI) Limited, New World Hotel Management Limited is a Hong Kong–based multi-national hotel management group and the parent company of Rosewood Hotels & Resorts (founded in 1979). The company is incorporated in the British Virgin Islands as an offshore company. As of 2016, Rosewood Hotel Group was owned by Chow Tai Fook Enterprises, having acquired Rosewood Hotel Group in 2015 from Chow Tai Fook Enterprises' listed associate company New World China Land for HK$1.96 billion.

Rosewood Hotel Group is headed by Sonia Cheng, daughter of Henry Cheng and granddaughter of the late Cheng Yu-tung, the patriarchs of Chow Tai Fook Enterprises and New World Development. She was appointed as the executive vice-chairman of New World Hotel Management Limited in February 2009 and one of the executive director of New World China Land, the parent company at that time in January 2010.

== History ==
=== Predecessors ===
New World Hospitality and New World Hotel Management could be traced back to New World Hotel (later renamed to Renaissance Kowloon Hotel and demolished in the 2010s along with the rest of New World Centre) that opened in the 1980s, Hotel Victoria in Shun Tak Centre (which the hotel became defunct, the building was refurnished as an office tower), as well as the listed real estate developer New World Development and its subsidiaries New World Hotels (Holdings) and New World Hotels International Limited. The latter was incorporated in 1983. In 1987, The Harbour View Hotel (now Renaissance Harbour View Hotel) in the Hong Kong Convention and Exhibition Centre, was also planned to be manage by New World Development group themselves, via New World Hotels International.

In parallel with the acquisition of Ramada-Renaissance Hotels in 1989, New World Development had established its own team in hotel investment and management.

In the 1990s, New World Development entered Mainland China market as hotel manager. In 1990, the group managed 6 hotels in Mainland China, namely Jing-guang New World in Beijing, Yangtze New World in Shanghai, China Hotel in Guangzhou, Dragon Hotel in Hangzhou, Gui-shan Hotel in Guilin as well as New World Dynasty Hotel in Xi'an. Currently, the management contracts for those 6 hotels (except Jing-guang New World which was owned by NWD group) were no longer owned by NWD group.

In 1995, NWD group split the Renaissance Hotels into two parallel subsidiaries: a hotel property holding company Hotel Property Investment (BVI) Limited and a hotel management company Renaissance Hotel Group N.V. New World Hotels International Limited, another hotel management company of the NWD group, became a subsidiary of Renaissance Hotel Group instead. Renaissance Hotel Group became a listed company on the New York Stock Exchange on 27 September 1995. Renaissance Hotel Group also acquired the minority interest of New World Hotels International from several people that connected to NWD group, such NWD directors Stewart Leung Chi-kin, Chan Kam-ling, as well as William Doo Wai-hoi, son-in-law of the patriarch of NWD group, Cheng Yu-tung.

The hotel management company Renaissance Hotel Group was sold in April 1997, for US$491 million (approx. HK$3.8 billion). The Hong Kong incorporated New World Hotels International Limited was also renamed to Renaissance Hotels International Limited in 2005 and RHIL Limited in 2007. Despite NWD group parted away from Renaissance Hotels, 2 out of 4 hotels of New World China Land (a sub-holding listed company of New World Development) in mainland China, were still managed by Renaissance's buyer Marriott International, under Courtyard brand as of 2003–04 financial year. The other two hotels were Mayfair Hotel in Shanghai (it shared the same Chinese name 巴黎春天; 'Paris spring' with department stores of sister company New World Department Store China) and New World Hotel in Shenyang. A strategic alliance was also formed with Marriott International in 1997–98 financial year.

The management contracts of the Courtyard hotels of the NWD group had expired in years 2010 to 2011. The Courtyard by Marriott Beijing became Pentahotel Beijing in 2010–11 financial year, while New World Courtyard Hotel, Shunde became New World Hotel Shunde. Both hotels were managed by New World Hotel Management, a unit of NWD group at that time.

=== New World Hotel Management ===
Circa 2006, New World Development group started to focus on re-expanding its own hotel management unit for new hotels of New World China Land (NWCL), as well as for those hotels that the management contract were expiring. The unit, known as New World Hotel Management Limited, was incorporated in Hong Kong in 2005. The 65% stake of the parent company of the unit, New World Hotel Management (BVI) Limited, was acquired by New World China Land along with Beijing New World Property Management Limited for HK$1.404 million in August–November 2006. The stake of New World Hotel Management (BVI), that owned by NWCL, was increased to 70.5% since February 2008. It reached 100% in January 2009. It was reported that the minority shareholder was William Doo, Jr., son of William Doo Wai-hoi, vice-chairman of New World China Land.

In January 2008, New World Hotel Management signed a contract with parent company New World Development, to manage the Jing-Guang New World Hotel in Jing Guang Centre, which the hotel was majority owned by New World Development and ultimate parent company Chow Tai Fook Enterprises.

New World Hotel Management (BVI) Limited also owned New World Hotel Management (Macau) Limited, a hotel management company based in Macau. The Macau company signed a contract in June 2008, to manage L'Arc New World Hotel Macau for 10 years, and renewable afterwards. The hotel was 40% owned by International Entertainment Corporation, a listed subsidiary of privately owned Chow Tai Fook Enterprises group at that time, but not belongs to New World Development group.

New World Hotel Management also started to introduce the brand Penta to the Mainland China in October 2008, and part of the Mayfair Hotel in Shanghai, became Pentahotel Shanghai.

According to China Daily, as of 2009, 8 hotels would be managed by New World Hotel Management and under New World brand. The hotels were located in Beijing, Shanghai (New World Mayfair Hotel Shanghai), Macau (L'Arc Macau), Dalian, Shenyang, Wuhan, Xi'an and Ho Chi Minh City respectively. A new slogan A New World of Difference was also announced.

In 2011, New World Hotel Management (BVI) Limited (trading as New World Hospitality) acquired Rosewood Hotels & Resorts. The deal included the entire membership interests of Rosewood Hotels and Resorts, LLC and the related intellectual property rights, for US$229.5 million (approx. HK$1.79 billion).

In April 2013, it was reported that four more pentahotels were planned to open in the Greater China area.

In December 2013, New World Hotel Management (BVI) also acquired hotel management company Pentahotels (incorporated as Penta Hotel Holdings Limited and Penta Hotels Germany GmbH respectively) from the ultimate parent company of New World China Land, privately owned Chow Tai Fook Enterprises, for €13.536 million (approx. HK$144.8352 million).

In 2013, the trading name of New World Hotel Management was also changed from New World Hospitality to Rosewood Hotel Group.

=== Rosewood Hotel Group ===
Rosewood Hotel Group was the new trading name of New World Hotel Management since 2013.

On 9 June 2014, New World Hotels announced the acquisition of the managing rights of New World Millennium Hong Kong Hotel by forming a joint venture with Millennium & Copthorne Hotels. The hotel was previously known as Hotel Nikko Hongkong. According to the press release, the hotel was owned by a joint venture of Chow Tai Fook [sic] and Millennium & Copthorne Hotels.

On 10 June 2014, Rosewood Guangzhou was announced. It was scheduled to open in Guangzhou CTF Finance Centre in 2019.

On 24 June 2014, New World Hotel Management and NWH Management Philippines, signed a contract with International Entertainment Corporation for managing a hotel in Metro Manila, the Philippines. The hotel, as of 2018, was known as AG New World Manila Bay Hotel.

In July 2015, New World China Land sold New World Hotel Management (BVI) and its subsidiaries, to New World China Land's indirect parent company Chow Tai Fook Enterprises, for HK$1.96 billion. According to the press release, the price was 1.5% more than the fair value of the net assets (equity), plus the to-be-acquired shareholder loan to Rosewood Hotel Group. The book value of the company's equity was negative.

Soon after, New World China Land was privatized by New World Development in 2016.

According to 2015 press release, Chow Tai Fook Enterprises and New World China Land signed a master hotel leasing agreement, which Chow Tai Fook Enterprises continued to lease hotels from New World China Land until 2025, and renewable to 2035.

In November 2016, Rosewood Hotel partnered with sister company New World Development again, which the hotel management company would occupied some floor area of Victoria Dockside for their Rosewood Hong Kong hotel. The hotel was designed by Tony Chi and was opened in March 2019.

In 2017, New World Development sold New World Hotel Shanghai, pentahotel Shanghai and the nearby Shanghai Ramada Plaza to the vice-chairman of New World Development, William Doo Wai-hoi, for RMB1.85 billion (approx. HK$2.2 billion at that time). According to NWD group, William Doo also a brother-in-law of Henry Cheng, patriarch of CTFE–NWD group, thus an uncle of Sonia Cheng, the CEO of Rosewood Hotel Group. As of 2018, New World Hotel Shanghai and pentahotel Shanghai were still managed by Rosewood Hotel Group.

As of 2017, One of the 3 hotels of Baha Mar Resort in Nassau, Bahamas, was managed by Rosewood. The mega-resort was acquired by Rosewood Hotel Group's parent company Chow Tai Fook Enterprises in 2016.

Despite selling the hotel management unit Rosewood Hotel Group to the parent company Chow Tai Fook Enterprises, as of March 2019, New World Development still owned 16 hotels, including Rosewood Hotel Group's Rosewood Phuket, Rosewood Hong Kong, Rosewood Beijing, pentahotel Hong Kong, pentahotel Beijing, New World Shunde, New World Wuhan, New World Beijing, New World Makati, New World Saigon and 6 other hotels that were under other hotel management companies (2 Renaissance, 3 Hyatt and 1 Novotel).

Rosewood Hotel Group brands:

- New World Hotels & Resorts
- Rosewood Hotels & Resorts
- Asaya, A Rosewood Spa
- Carlyle & Co.
- KHOS (2017-2023), renamed to New World Hotels & Resorts

== Senior Leadership ==
=== List of CEOs ===
1. Ray Wong (2005–2009)
2. Sonia Cheng (from 2009)

== List of hotels and resorts ==
=== New World ===
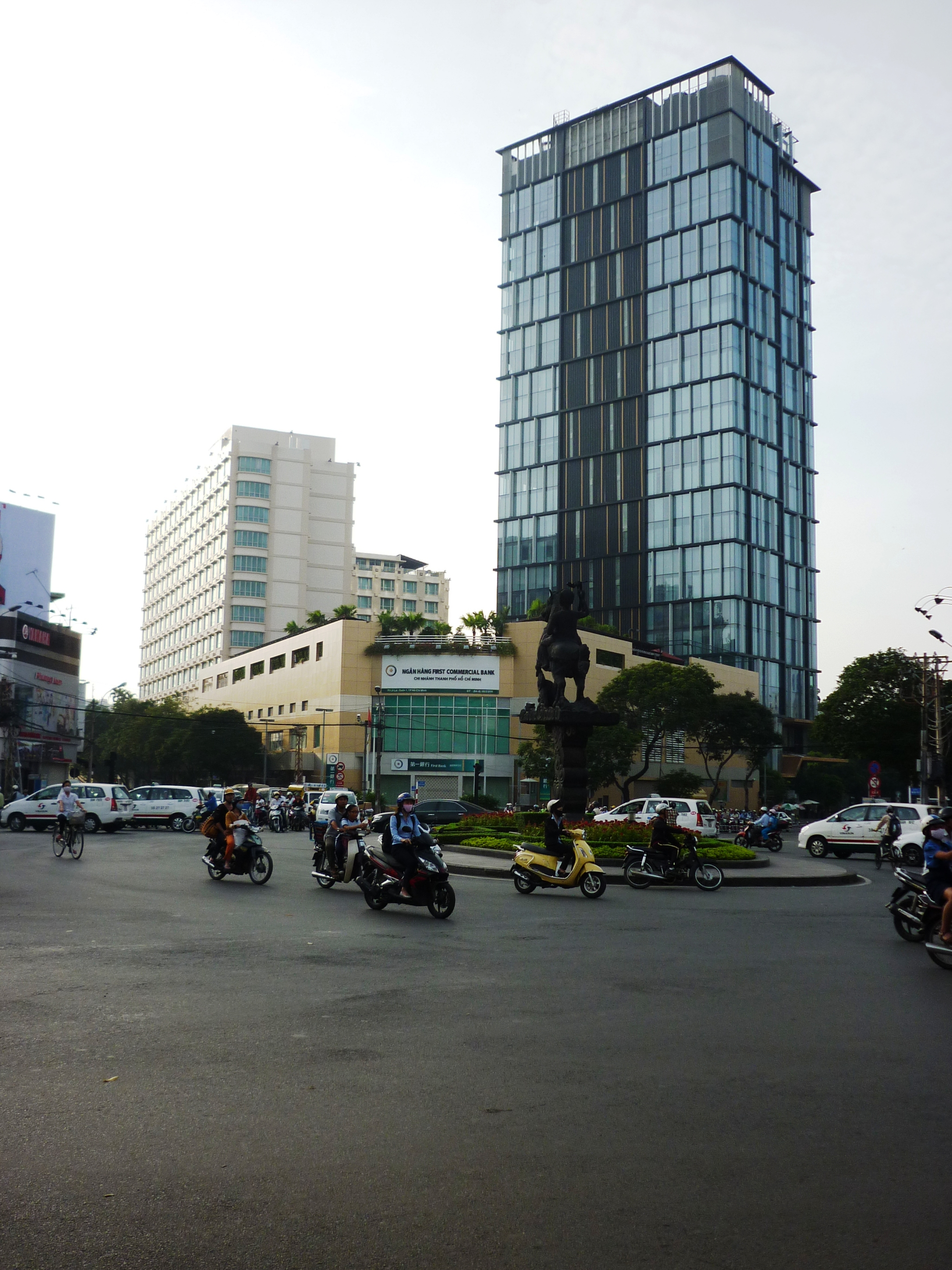
New World Saigon Hotel

As of 2025.

- New World Beijing Hotel (Wangfujing)
- New World Chongqing Hotel (Chongqing)
- New World Dalian Hotel (Dalian)
- New World Wuhan Hotel (Wuhan)
- New World Shunde Hotel (Shunde, Foshan)
- New World Millennium Hong Kong Hotel (East Tsim Sha Tsui)
- New World Qingyuan Hotel (Qingyuan)
- New World Langfang Hotel (Langfang)
- New World Shenyang Hotel (Shenyang)
- New World Jinzhou Hotel (Jinzhou)
- New World Taishan Hotel (Taishan, Guangdong)
- New World Nha Trang Hotel (Nha Trang; future opening)
- New World Guangzhou Hotel (Guangzhou)
- New World Makati Hotel (Makati)
- New World Saigon Hotel (Bến Thành)
- New World Hoiana Hotel (Duy Hải, Duy Xuyên; suburb of Hội An)
- New World Hoiana Beach Resort (Duy Hải, Duy Xuyên)
- New World Phu Quoc Resort (Phú Quốc)
- New World Guiyang Hotel (Guiyang)

=== Rosewood ===
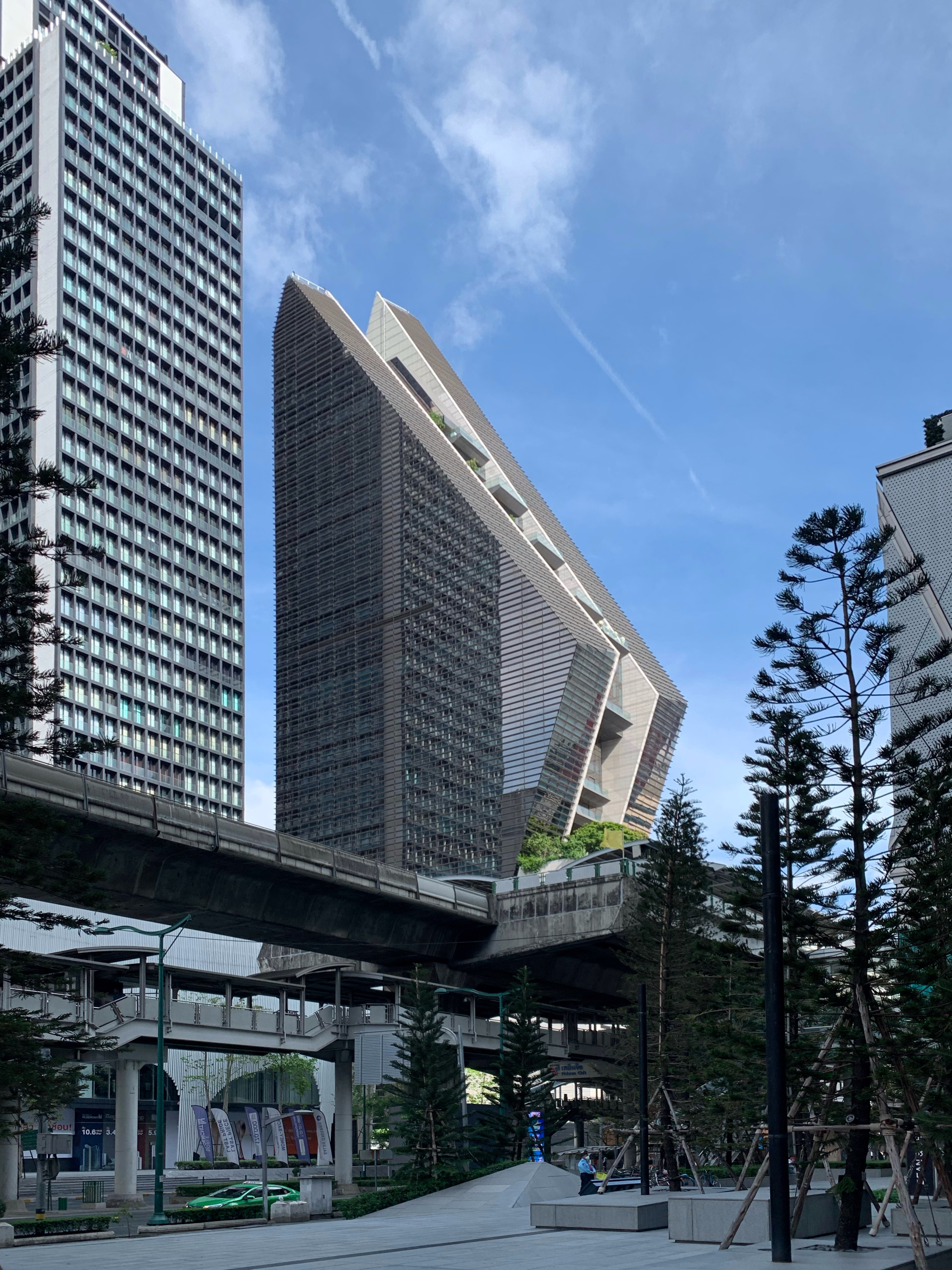
Rosewood Bangkok

Selected hotels and resorts are:

- Rosewood Hotel Georgia (Vancouver)
- Rosewood Sand Hill (Menlo Park, California)
- The Carlyle, A Rosewood Hotel (New York City)
- Rosewood Washington, D.C. (Washington, D.C.)
- Rosewood Miramar Beach (Montecito, California)
- Rosewood Mansion on Turtle Creek (Dallas)
- Rosewood Inn of the Anasazi (Santa Fe, New Mexico)
- Kona Village, A Rosewood Resort (Kailua-Kona, Hawaii)
- Rosewood São Paulo (Brazil)
- Rosewood Mayakoba (Mexico)
- Rosewood San Miguel de Allende (Mexico)
- Las Ventanas al Paraiso, A Rosewood Resort (Mexico)
- Rosewood Bermuda (Bermuda)
- Rosewood Baha Mar (The Bahamas)
- Rosewood Little Dix Bay (British Virgin Islands)
- Rosewood London (London)
- The Chancery Rosewood (London)
- Rosewood Castiglion del Bosco (Italy)
- Hôtel de Crillon, A Rosewood Hotel (Paris)
- Rosewood Jeddah (Saudi Arabia)
- Rosewood Abu Dhabi (United Arab Emirates)
- Rosewood Sanya (China)
- Rosewood Beijing (China)
- Rosewood Miyakojima (Miyako Island, Japan)
- Rosewood Phuket (Thailand)
- Rosewood Bangkok (Thailand)
- Rosewood Yangon (Myanmar)
- Rosewood Luang Prabang (Laos)
- Rosewood Phnom Penh (Cambodia)
- Rosewood Hong Kong (Victoria Dockside)
- Rosewood Guangzhou (Guangzhou CTF Finance Centre)
