= Chow Tai Fook =

Hong Kong–based privately owned conglomerate

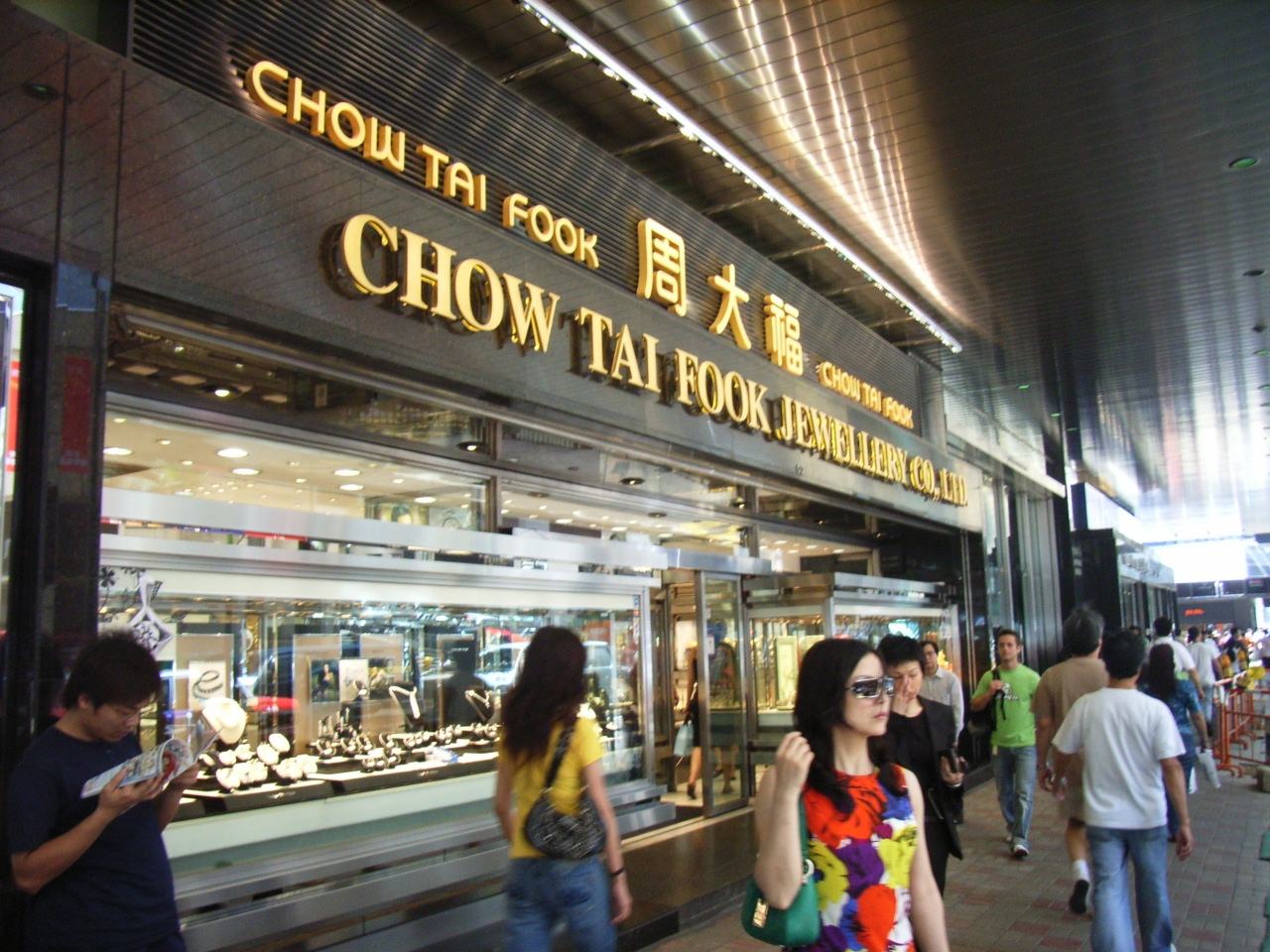
- Shop of Chow Tai Fook Jewellery in Queen's Road Central, Hong Kong
- Type: Private
- Industry: Conglomerate
- Founded: 1929; 97 years ago in Guangzhou; 1961 in Hong Kong (as Chow Tai Fook Jewellery Co., Ltd.); 10 August 1966 in Hong Kong (as Chow Tai Fook Enterprises)
- Founder: Chow Chi-yuen
- Headquarters: 38/F, New World Tower, Hong Kong
- Area served: mainland China, Hong Kong, Japan, Macau, Malaysia, Singapore, South Korea, Taiwan, United States, Canada
- Key people: Henry Cheng
- Products: jewellery; real estate
- Brands: CTF
- Services: transportation; telecommunications
- Owner: Cheng Yu-tung family
- Subsidiaries: Chow Tai Fook (Holding); Chow Tai Fook Enterprises; CTF Holdings; Chow Tai Fook Nominee; Chow Tai Fook Jewellery; New World Development

Chinese name
- Traditional Chinese: 周大福
- Simplified Chinese: 周大福
- Jyutping: zau1 daai6 fuk1
- Cantonese Yale: jāu daaih fūk
- Hanyu Pinyin: Zhōu Dà Fú
- Literal meaning: Zhou – good luck / good fortune
Transcriptions
Standard Mandarin
- Hanyu Pinyin: Zhōu Dà Fú
Yue: Cantonese
- Yale Romanization: jāu daaih fūk
- Jyutping: zau1 daai6 fuk1

Chow Tai Fook Enterprises Limited
- Traditional Chinese: 周大福企業有限公司
- Simplified Chinese: 周大福企业有限公司
- Jyutping: zau1 daai6 fuk1 kei5 jip6 jau5 haan6 gung1 si1
- Hanyu Pinyin: Zhōu Dà Fú Qǐyè Yǒuxiàngōngsī
Transcriptions
Standard Mandarin
- Hanyu Pinyin: Zhōu Dà Fú Qǐyè Yǒuxiàngōngsī
Yue: Cantonese
- Jyutping: zau1 daai6 fuk1 kei5 jip6 jau5 haan6 gung1 si1

Chow Tai Fook group
- Traditional Chinese: 周大福集團
Transcriptions
- Website: www.chowtaifook.com

Chow Tai Fook group is a Hong Kong–based, privately owned conglomerate with holdings in the jewellery, property development, hotel, department store, transportation, energy, telecommunications, port, casino, and other businesses. Despite the holding companies of the group, namely Chow Tai Fook Capital Limited, Chow Tai Fook (Holding) Limited, Chow Tai Fook Enterprises Limited, etc. being privately owned, the group has been partially listed on the stock market via associate company New World Development (SEHK: 17, listed since 1972) and subsidiary Chow Tai Fook Jewellery Group Limited (SEHK: 1929, listed since 2011). As of 31 December 2018, New World Development was ranked as the 47th-largest company by market capitalisation on the Stock Exchange of Hong Kong, which was HK$105.7 billion.

However, the size of the unlisted portions of the Chow Tai Fook business empire is unclear. The Financial Times quoted one banker of the Cheng Yu-tung family, who said, "You can't look at [Cheng] YT without looking at the private side of the business and his ability to spot early investment opportunities". Notable unlisted businesses of the group include Rosewood Hotel Group, as well as Australia-based Alinta Energy and the Loy Yang B power station, which were acquired in 2017.

Chow Tai Fook Capital is owned by the descendants of the late Chow Tai Fook Jewellery founder Chow Chi-yuen (Chinese: 周至元) and his son-in-law, the late Cheng Yu-tung, which includes the current Chow Tai Fook Jewellery Group chairman, Chow Tai Fook (Holding) director Henry Cheng.

== History ==
The Chow Tai Fook group began with the Chow Tai Fook jewellery store, founded by Chow Chi-yuen in 1929 in Guangzhou, China. The store shifted its business to Portuguese Macau in 1940 (some say 1931) and then to British Hong Kong after the breakout of the Second Sino-Japanese War in the 1930s and the establishment of the People's Republic of China in 1949. The group returned to mainland China after the market reforms of the 1980s, notably as New World Department Store China and former listed company New World China Land.

Cheng Yu-tung took over the business empire from his father-in-law Chow Chi-yuen in 1956. In the 1960s, Chow's son Stephen Chow Shue-tong (周樹堂), an architect, helped found Chow Tai Fook group's real estate division, which in 1972 would be listed as New World Development. After the outbreak of the 1967 leftist riots, Stephen Chow emigrated to Canada., among several sons of Chow who left Hong Kong. Cheng built the group into a diversified empire, with interests in jewellery retailing, real estate, hotels, transportation, public utilities and other businesses. In 1961, Chow Tai Fook Jewellery built a residential building at 265–275 Tai Nan Street, Sham Shui Po, Kowloon. The building was also named after Tai Fook (大福唐樓). The group, via Chow Tai Fook Enterprises, also made private investments in real estate and hotels.

One of the main holding companies of the group, Chow Tai Fook Enterprises Limited, was incorporated on 10 August 1966 in British Hong Kong, while the flagship listed company New World Development Company Ltd was incorporated in 1970 in Hong Kong. The jewellery store chain was incorporated as Chow Tai Fook Jewellery Company Ltd in 1961 in British Hong Kong, and a new holding company for the jewellery division was incorporated in the Cayman Islands and listed in the Hong Kong SAR as Chow Tai Fook Jewellery Group Ltd in 2011.

As of 2018, the group also consists of two more parent companies in the group structure, namely Chow Tai Fook Capital Limited and its subsidiary Chow Tai Fook (Holding) Limited. They were incorporated in the British Virgin Islands. Chow Tai Fook (Holding) is the parent company of Chow Tai Fook Enterprises and Chow Tai Fook Jewellery Group.

== Subsidiaries and affiliates ==
The Chow Tai Fook group, via Chow Tai Fook (Holding) Limited (incorporated in the British Virgin Islands) and Chow Tai Fook Enterprises Limited (incorporated in Hong Kong), owned two listed companies as the significant shareholder: Chow Tai Fook Jewellery Group Limited (周大福珠寶集團有限公司, incorporated in the Cayman Islands; 89.3%) and New World Development Company Limited (新世界發展有限公司; 44.39%). New World Development also owned a few listed second-tier subsidiaries (with regard to Chow Tai Fook Enterprises), such as New World Department Store China, NWS Holdings, etc. New World China Land, another second-tier subsidiary, was a listed company until its privatization by New World Development in 2016. The privatisation of listed second-tier subsidiary New World Department Store China by New World Development was not approved by the minority shareholders in 2017. Another second-tier listed subsidiary, New World Hotels (Holdings), was privatized by New World Development and Chow Tai Fook Enterprises in 1990.

New World Development is a constituent of the Hong Kong blue-chip Hang Seng Index. Chow Tai Fook Jewellery Group, as of 13 October 2016, was the world's second-largest jeweller by [total] market capitalization.

=== Chow Tai Fook Jewellery Group ===
Chow Tai Fook Jewellery is a jewellery store and gold shop (Chinese: 珠寶金行 金行; 'gold shop') founded by Chow Chi-yuen in 1929 in Guangzhou, China. His son-in-law Cheng Yu-tung took over the business in 1956 and their descendants continue to own the business today. Chow Tai Fook Jewellery Company Limited (周大福珠寶金行有限公司) was the core company of the store chain. It was incorporated in British Hong Kong in 1961. The brand is popular in the Chinese-speaking world, according to a research by CLSA. The store has retail outlets in several countries, including over 6,800 retail outlets in mainland China.

Cheng invented gold with 99.99% purity as a product of Chow Tai Fook Jewellery, which became a standard for industry peers in Hong Kong. In 1964, Chow Tai Fook Jewellery acquired a license for purchasing diamonds from De Beers, the monopoly supplier at that time. It was reported that 30% of diamond imports into Hong Kong in the 1970s were purchased by Chow Tai Fook.

In 1960s, Chow Tai Fook established another brand (Chinese: 萬年珠寶公司; lit. 'Ten thousand year jewellery company') in a building of the same name (Manning House, in Chinese: 萬年大廈) in Central. Manning House became one of the rental properties of the jeweller's sister company New World Development's portfolio in the 1970s.

In 1971, Chow Tai Fook Jewellery introduced ornaments made of vitreous enamel. It was credited as a new industry of Hong Kong at that time.

In 1989, Chow Tai Fook Jewellery broke the record for the highest price paid for a rough diamond. The company paid US$10 million for a diamond weighing 255.61 carats.

By September 2010, the chain had 1,000 stores in mainland China, including franchisees and its own outlets. Chow Tai Fook Jewellery has played a leading role in its market segment since it foundation, especially since 1997.

In 2010, Chow Tai Fook Jewellery purchased Cullinan Heritage, a 507-carat diamond, for US$35.3 million, setting a new record for the highest price paid for a rough diamond.

On 15 December 2011, the jewellery division of Chow Tai Fook group, under new holding company Chow Tai Fook Jewellery Group Ltd, was listed on the Stock Exchange of Hong Kong at a price of HK$15 per share under the stock code (ticker symbol) 1929, the year of establishment of the chain.

On 4 April 2017, according to Sotheby's, Chow Tai Fook (the press release claimed it was jeweller Chow Tai Fook but Financial Times, quoting a Sotheby's tweet, reported it as Chow Tai Fook Enterprises) acquired the Pink Star diamond at an auction in Hong Kong for US$71.2 million (HK$553 million).

On 23 May 2018, the Gemological Institute of America (GIA) partnered with Chow Tai Fook on a pilot program that will use blockchain to deliver digital diamond-grading reports.

On 17 January 2020, Chow Tai Fook Jewellery Group acquired the natural-coloured gem specialist ENZO.

As at 31 December 2024, the group had 7,065 points of sale in total, including 6,904 POS in mainland China and 161 combined in Hong Kong & Macau of China and other markets. The Group closed a net of 281 POS during the 3Q of FY2025. *"shop-in-shop"/"counter-in-shop” excluded

==== Incidents ====
Chow Tai Fook Jewellery has fallen victim to major crime a number of times. In 1966, diamonds worth HK$1.23 million at that time, were stolen during transport from South Africa. In 1974, diamonds worth HK$250,000 were stolen from the staff of Chow Tai Fook Jewellery in Manning House, Central, Hong Kong. In 1980 and 1981, the Kowloon City branch was hit twice by armed robberies. The thieves also injured a staff member of the jewellery store and a student walking nearby in the second robbery. In 1985, in front of the Kowloon City branch, a gunfight broke out between the Royal Hong Kong Police and the robbers, in which a policeman was injured. On the same day, a man with a gunshot wound arrived at the hospital, who was suspected to be one of the robbers. In 1989, armed robbers disguised as customers stole luxury watches from the Causeway Bay Plaza branch. It was reported the watches had a worth of HK$5 million at that time. In 1991, the Kowloon City branch suffered another armed robbery, followed by the robbery of the China Building branch in Central in September and again in October 1991. In 1998 another branch in Paterson Street, Causeway Bay was robbed by Kwai Ping-hung. Kwai Ping-hung, who was also involved in other crime where he was deemed Hong Kong's most wanted man.

In recent years, however, the company has seldom experienced armed robberies. Notorious robbers Yip Kai Foon and Kwai Ping-hung were arrested in 1996 and 2003, respectively.

=== New World Development ===
New World Development is one of the leading property developers based in Hong Kong. It has been listed on the Hong Kong stock exchange since 23 November 1972. The initial public offering price was HK$2, issuing about 96.75 million of new shares. The shares were initially traded in 3 out of the 4 exchanges of Hong Kong, namely the Hong Kong Stock Exchange, Far East Exchange and Kam Ngan Stock Exchange, the predecessors of the current Stock Exchange of Hong Kong.

As of 2018, New World Development is the parent company of listed companies NWS Holdings (SEHK: 659, listed since 1997), New World Department Store China (SEHK: 825, listed since 2007) and former listed companies New World Hotels (Holdings) (acquired in 1976, privatized in 1990), and New World China Land (listed in 1999, privatized in 2016). New World Development also owned former listed companies NW China Investment (listed in Ireland, privatized), New World Infrastructure (listed in 1995, privatized as New World TMT), and Renaissance Hotel Group (listed in 1995, sold in 1997).

As of 1986, Chow Tai Fook Enterprises (CTFE) owned 466,927,948 shares in New World Development, or about 43% of the issued share capital. As of 2018, CTFE still owned 44.41% shares of NWD, or 4,535,634,444 shares.

New World Development started its expansion in the 1970s with the acquisition of numerous properties and companies. The flagship property, New World Centre was built on the former site of Holt's Wharf, a former godown terminal that was owned by British companies Swire Group and Blue Funnel Line. In the first financial year after the initial public offering in November 1972, NWD had acquired 23 sites by paying HK$110 million in cash, and about 101 million new shares with a par value of HK$1 each. The issue of new shares and the acquisitions of the holding companies of properties such as Kowloon Town Development Company Limited (not to be confused with Kowloon Development Company) were completed in the 1973–74 financial year. The company also formed joint ventures with fellow developer Sun Hung Kai Properties (SHK) and non-profit organisation Tung Wah Group of Hospitals. Kwok Tak-seng, patriarch of SHK, also served as a director of New World Development from the 1970s until his death in 1990.

One of the initial rental holdings of NWD, Manning House, was in fact developed by Kin Kiu Enterprises (建僑企業) in 1965. It was reported that Cheng Yu-tung, patriarch of Chow Tai Fook Jewellery, was one of the directors of Kin Kiu Enterprises at that time. Both Kin Kiu Enterprises and Manning House were part of NWD's initial wholly owned subsidiaries and portfolio in 1973. The 11th floor of Manning House also served as the headquarters of NWD. According to the news report, the known directors of Kin Kiu Enterprises were Young Chi-wan (楊志雲; notable for King Fook Jewellery and Hotel Miramar), as well as K.W. Yue (余基溫, notable for Hotel Miramar), who also served as the chairman of the company. As of 1973, Young and his son Albert Yeung Bing-ching (楊秉正) were the directors of NWD, of which Young also served as one of the two vice-chairmen. As of 1986, Albert Yeung and his brother Howard Yeung Ping-leung (楊秉樑) still served as members of the board of NWD. Albert also owned a small personal stake in NWD in 1986.

New World Hotels (Holdings), formerly Kai Tak Land Investment, was incorporated in 1957 and was acquired by New World Development in October 1976. Kai Tak Land Investment's Kai Tak Commercial Building was added to NWD's rental portfolio. In October 1976, NWD also acquired privately owned Timely Enterprises. Timely Enterprises was the company that owned the American International Tower (友邦行; named after AIA Group), which was renamed New World Tower (now New World Tower, tower 1) in 1980. It was the headquarters of New World Development and Chow Tai Fook Enterprises. Construction companies, such as Hip Hing Construction, Vibro (Hong Kong), and others were acquired by NWD circa 1973.

In the past, NWD also owned New World Telecommunications, one of Hong Kong's major telecommunication companies. However, the sale of NWD to competitor HKBN in 2016 was described by Financial Times as part of "the process of succession planning [of the largest tycoon families of Hong Kong] as the founders reach retirement age or pass away.". NWD also previously owned a minority stake in CSL New World Mobility. The stake was sold to the PCCW group in 2013. One-third of the share capital of Asia Television (ATV) was acquired in 1988, but the stake was sold in the 1990s.

In the nearby enclave of Portuguese Macau, NWD [sic] once owned an 85% stake of Macao Water (also known as Sociedade de Abastecimento de Águas de Macau) via a joint venture with French company Suez Lyonnaise des Eaux as of 1987. The stake of the intermediate parent company of Macao Water was transferred to listed subsidiary New World Infrastructure in 1997. The same French company had attempted to acquire Companhia de Electricidade de Macau (CEM) from Sociedade de Turismo e Diversões de Macau in 1987, by forming a joint venture with a company owned by Cheng Yu-tung [sic]. The stake of the aforementioned water and electricity joint venture, Sino-French Holdings (Hong Kong), held by Chow Tai Fook Enterpriese (CTFE), was sold to the listed second-tier subsidiary of CTFE, New World Infrastructure, in 1997 for HK$1 billion The stake in Sino-French Holdings (Hong Kong) was then transferred to another listed subsidiary NWS Holdings. The indirect stake in CEM was sold in 2014.

As of 2018, New World Development owned 16 hotels, but most of them have been closely associated with a hotel management unit, Rosewood Hotel Group, that was privately owned by Chow Tai Fook Enterprises.

On top of using its own resources, New World Development also partnered with parent company Chow Tai Fook group on a number of redevelopment projects, such as the acquisition of a 90% stake in Kut Cheong Mansion (吉祥大廈) in North Point in the 2010s. Chow Tai Fook Enterprises, via Sunbig Limited, sold a 40% stake in the aforementioned Kut Cheong Mansion to New World Development for HK$1.779 billion in January 2015.

In 2010, the Chinese translation of a book, Land and the Ruling Class in Hong Kong, popularized the term 地產霸權; 'real estate hegemony' to describe Hong Kong's real estate tycoon families. The combined Chow Tai Fook–New World Development group was one of the families described in the book. The owners of the Chow Tai Fook–New World Development group, the Cheng Yu-tung family, has been sometimes considered one of the four big tycoon families of Hong Kong.

==== NWS Transport Services ====
NWS Holdings, via NWS Transport Services, owned Citybus and New World First Bus, two of the franchised bus service providers in Hong Kong. The two companies operate as a monopoly on the bus routes of Hong Kong Island, as well as some of the cross-harbour routes.

In the past, Citybus was owned by British company Stagecoach Group. In 2003 Chow Tai Fook Enterprises, via wholly owned subsidiary Delta Pearl Limited, acquired the bus company for HK$1,646 million, plus the refurbishment of Citybus' debt to third parties which amounted to HK$554 million. In 2004, ownership was transferred to NWS Transport Services, a joint venture between listed portion (NWS Holdings) and the unlisted portion of Chow Tai Fook Enterprises. NWS Transport Services also owned New World First Bus and New World First Ferry. In December 2016, NWS Holdings acquired the remaining 50% share of NWS Transport Services from parent company Chow Tai Fook Enterprises, floating the bus businesses indirectly on the stock exchange. The price was HK$1.38 billion.

=== Goshawk Aviation ===
Goshawk Aviation was a 50–50 joint venture of Chow Tai Fook Enterprises and associate company NWS Holdings.

In June 2018, Goshawk Aviation acquired Irish-based Sky Aviation Leasing International, an aviation leasing company. The company also ordered 20 A320neo from Airbus in July 2018. In a separate deal, Goshawk Aviation ordered 20 Boeing 737 MAXs. The combined price of the two deals was estimated at US$4.5 billion.

Brian Cheng, son of Henry Cheng and grandson of Cheng Yu-tung, is the chairman of Goshawk Aviation.

=== Hotel divisions ===
On top of New World Development's investments in hotel properties and hotel management, Chow Tai Fook Enterprises (CTFE) also made direct investments in these areas.

In 1990, Chow Tai Fook Enterprises partnered with associate company New World Development to privatize New World Hotels (Holdings), a sub-holding listed company of New World Development in the hotel business. Chow Tai Fook Enterprises owned a 36% stake (indirectly, via Beames Holdings) in New World Hotels (Holdings) after the deal, while New World Development owned the remaining 64% indirectly.

In July 1997, some of the hotels from the former New World Hotels (Holdings) portfolio were sold by New World Development to CTF Holdings, which was owned by Henry Cheng and his employee and brother-in-law William Doo Wai-hoi at that time. As of 2018, CTF Holdings is a wholly owned subsidiary of Chow Tai Fook Enterprises.

However, CTFE's 36% stake in Beames Holdings (and its subsidiaries such as New World Hotels (Holdings)) was sold back to New World Development in November 2015. Two hotels from the former New World Hotels (Holdings), the Grand Hyatt Hong Kong and Renaissance Harbour View, changed ownership from Beames Holdings to New World Development (via Beames Holdings) and Abu Dhabi Investment Authority in a 50–50 split in April 2015.

In July 2015, New World China Land, another second-tier listed subsidiary of Chow Tai Fook Enterprises, sold the hotel management unit Rosewood Hotel Group to Chow Tai Fook Enterprises. Rosewood Hotel Group owned three brands: penta, New World, and Rosewood. The pentahotels unit was acquired by Rosewood Hotel Group from aforementioned CTF Holdings in December 2013.

Some of the hotels of New World Development, as of 2018, were still managed by Rosewood Hotel Group.

In 2016, CTFE acquired Baha Mar Resort, a mega-resort project in Nassau, Bahamas. The 3 hotels of Baha Mar Resort were then managed by Rosewood, Grand Hyatt, and SLS Hotels, respectively.

Rosewood Hotel Group was headed by Sonia Cheng, daughter of Henry Cheng and granddaughter of the late Cheng Yu-tung, patriarchs of CTFE and NWD.

== Other investments ==
Chow Tai Fook Capital owned shares of listed companies Giordano, Hsin Chong, Integrated Waste Solutions Group Holdings, Mongolia Energy Corporation, New Times Energy, and Shengjing Bank since 2015. These shares were personally owned by Cheng Yu-tung, patriarch of the Chow Tai Fook group, in the past. If counting underlying shares, as of 2018, Chow Tai Fook Capital, via Chow Tai Fook Nominee, owned 173.30% of issued shares of Mongolia Energy Corporation, as the denominator did not count underlying shares. Chow Tai Fook Nominee, as of 31 December 2017, owned 11.65% of the H shares of Shengjing Bank, equivalent to 3.10% of total share capital.

Chow Tai Fook Nominee also formed a private equity fund with listed company Credit China Holdings and VMS Investment, for "investing in collateral-backed lending transaction" in China in 2013. Chow Tai Fook Nominee acquired 272 million H shares of Ping An Insurance in 2011.

In 1990, it was reported that Chow Tai Fook Enterprises had formed a joint venture (Chinese: 新力投資) in Singapore, in which Chow Tai Fook Enterprises owned a 50% stake. The joint venture would invest in South East Asia.

In 2017, Chow Tai Fook Enterprises acquired Australia-based Alinta Energy from a private equity fund for AU$4 billion, as well as Loy Yang B power station from French multi-national company Engie for [AU]$1.2 billion. It was reported that the deal was partially financed by loans from 7 financial institutions, including the Bank of China (Hong Kong). In December 2025, it was announced that Chow Tai Fook would sell Alinta Energy, to Singapore-based Sembcorp Industries for an enterprise value of A$6.5 billion.

In March 2018, Chow Tai Fook [sic] acquired new shares in the Star Entertainment Group.

In 2018, Chow Tai Fook Enterprises, via a subsidiary (Chinese: 周大福投资), acquired a 30% share in Yunnan Jinggu Forestry, listed on the Shanghai Stock Exchange.

Listed company International Entertainment Corporation (IEC) was a second-tier subsidiary of Chow Tai Fook Enterprises. Chow Tai Fook Enterprises, via Mediastar International, owned 74.78% shares of IEC as of 31 March 2014. However, Chow Tai Fook Enterprises decreased its holdings to 4.89% as of April 2018.

In 1999, it was alleged that the Chow Tai Fook group's Tai Fook Securities division had lowered its commission rate below the Stock Exchange of Hong Kong's minimum, through a gift scheme from Chow Tai Fook Jewellery and New World Telephone.

== Links to organised crime ==
In 2015, the Queensland government regulators approved Chow Tai Fook's involvement with the $3.5 billion Queen's Wharf, Brisbane casino through their investment in Star Entertainment Group; in 2022, a The Weekend Australian's investigative report wrote they had found that the officials let them win the deal despite being aware of Chow Tai Fook's likely links to Triad groups, the ABC News (Australia) then looked into it further, reporting that Chow Tai Fook Enterprises (CTFE) has been linked to Chinese organized crime for decades, but the officials they had reached claimed that they were not aware of this at the time of the afore-mentioned approval. According to news reports, Chow Tai Fook has run joint ventures in the gambling industry with the high-profile figures Ho Hung Sun, Wan Kuok-koi and Chau Cheok Wa; both Wan and Chau are reputedly high level members of the Chinese triad group 14K. The Queensland government subsequently found Star unsuitable to hold a casino licence following an investigation into money laundering, and ordered further investigation into CTFE's ties to organized crime and on how they were approved for a casino license.

== Organisation chart ==
- Chow Tai Fook Capital
  - Chow Tai Fook (Holding)
    - Chow Tai Fook Enterprises
        - Goshawk Aviation (50-50 joint venture with NWS Holdings)
        - Rosewood Hotel Group
          - New World Hotels & Resorts
          - Rosewood Hotels & Resorts
        - Alinta Energy
        - Loy Yang B power station
      - 周大福投资
        - Yunnan Jinggu Forestry
      - CTF Holdings Limited
      - Mediastar International
        - International Entertainment Corporation (sold)
      - CTF Services
        - CTF Life
        - uSMART Securities (13.05%)
        - Blackhorn (65%)
      - New World Development
        - New World China Land
        - New World Department Store China
        - New World Hotels (Holdings)
        - New World Telephone Holdings
          - New World Telecommunications (sold)
        - NWS Holdings
          - NWS Transport Services
            - Citybus (sold)
            - New World First Bus (sold)
            - New World First Ferry (sold)
          - Hip Hing Construction
          - SUEZ NWS Limited (joint venture with Suez Environnement, formerly known as Sino-French Holdings (Hong Kong) Limited)
            - Sino-French Energy Development (sold)
              - Companhia de Electricidade de Macau (sold)
            - Macao Water
      - Chow Tai Fook Jewellery Group
        - Chow Tai Fook Jewellery
  - Chow Tai Fook Nominee
    - Mongolia Energy Corporation

== Namesakes ==
- Guangzhou CTF Finance Centre
- Tianjin CTF Finance Centre
- Wuhan Chow Tai Fook Finance Centre
- Chow Tai Fook Centre, in Mong Kok, Kowloon, Hong Kong (周大福商業中心)
- Chow Tai Fook commercial building, Central, Hong Kong Island, Hong Kong (周大福商業大廈)

== See also ==
- Eden of Coronet
- Chow Sang Sang, another jewellery store chain of Hong Kong
- King Fook Holdings, another jewellery store chain of Hong Kong
- Lukfook, another jewellery store chain of Hong Kong
