= New World Hotels (Holdings) =

Hong Kong company

- Formerly: Victoria Park Hotel; Kai Tak Land Investment; NWD (Hotels Investments)
- Company type: subsidiary (formerly listed)
- Industry: real estate
- Founded: 25 July 1957; 68 years ago
- Defunct: 1990 (privatization)
- Fate: privatized by the parent company; dismantled afterwards
- Headquarters: Hong Kong
- Products: residential property; hotels
Owner
| New World Development | (64%) |
| Chow Tai Fook Enterprises | (36%) |
- Parent: New World Development; (via Beames Holdings)
- Subsidiaries: Hotel Property Investments (BVI)

Chinese name
- Traditional Chinese: 新世界酒店（集團）有限公司
- Literal meaning: New world hotel (group) limited company
Transcriptions

Kai Tak Land Investment Co., Ltd.
- Traditional Chinese: 啟德置業有限公司
Transcriptions

Victoria Park Hotel Limited
- Traditional Chinese: 花園大酒店有限公司
- Literal meaning: Park/garden "Big" hotel limited company
Transcriptions

Victoria Park Hotel Limited
- Traditional Chinese: 維多利亞花園酒店有限公司
- Literal meaning: Victoria Park (garden) hotel limited company
Transcriptions
- Footnotes / references data updated right after 1990 privatization

New World Hotels (Holdings) Limited, formerly known as Kai Tak Land Investment Limited, is a former Hong Kong-listed company and currently a wholly owned subsidiary of New World Development.

== History ==
The company was incorporated as Victoria Park Hotel Limited in 1957 in British Hong Kong. It soon renamed as Kai Tak Land Investment in 1961. Kai Tak Land Investment became a listed company in the Far East Exchange and Kam Ngan Stock Exchange (Chinese: 金銀證劵交易所; lit. 'Gold and silver securities exchange') in 1972. The exchanges were the predecessors of the Stock Exchange of Hong Kong.

The company was the developer of a building of the same name, Kai Tak Commercial Building. However, it is located in Des Voeux Road Central, Sheung Wan, Hong Kong Island, instead of the area near the Kai Tak Airport, eastern Kowloon. The company also owned some leaseholds of crown land in Tai Kok Tsui, western Kowloon for development into residential buildings.

In October 1976, the controlling stake of the company was acquired by fellow listed developer New World Development (NWD). NWD issued 46,226,000 number of new shares as a payment of the acquisition.

The list company later became the sub-holding company for the hotel assets of New World Development. The company was proposed to rename as New World Hotels (Holdings) in 1985, and effective in 1986.

In 1990, Chow Tai Fook Enterprises, partnered with associate company New World Development, attempted to privatize New World Hotels (Holdings) for HK$6.25 per shares. The two companies formed a joint venture in 36%:64% ratio to acquire the remaining shares from other shareholders. It was reported that before the deal, New World Development and Chow Tai Fook Enterprises already owned 50.13% and 24.54% shares respectively. The privatization was completed on 26 June 1990.

According to Ta Kung Pao, if including to be acquired Ramada–Renaissance Hotels, whole New World Development group owned (or managing) 152,336 hotel rooms at that time. It included hotels in the United States (144,000 rooms in total), Taiwan (namely 觀光飯店; 249 rooms), Vancouver (New World Harbourside; 432 rooms), Guangzhou (China Hotel; 1,200 rooms), Hangzhou (Dragon; Chinese: 黃龍; lit. 'yellow dragon'; 570 rooms), Guilin (name Chinese: 桂山; pinyin: Guìshān; 610 rooms), Xi'an (New World Dynasty; Chinese: 古都; lit. 'old capital'; 502 rooms), Shanghai (Yangtze New World; 577 rooms), Beijing (Jingguang New World; 497 rooms), Suzhou (namely 雅都; 'elegant capital'; 409 rooms), as well as 5 hotels in Hong Kong, namely New World in Tsim Sha Tsui (723 rooms), The Regent Hong Kong (602 rooms), Hotel Victoria (but in Chinese: 海港; lit. 'harbour') in Sheung Wan Shun Tak Centre (539 rooms), as well as the twin hotels Grand Hyatt Hong Kong (574 rooms), Renaissance Harbour View Hotel (852 rooms) in the Hong Kong Convention and Exhibition Centre, Wan Chai.

The joint venture between Chow Tai Fook Enterprises and New World Development in hotels business, was known as Beames Holdings Limited.

== Legacy ==
After several additions and disposals, as of 2018, New World Development fully or partially owned 16 hotels. However, only 5 in mainland China (3 in Beijing, 1 in Shunde, 1 in Wuhan). Some of them under penta, New World and Rosewood brands, which were managed by Rosewood Hotel Group, the hotel management unit owned by Chow Tai Fook Enterprises, privately owned parent company of New World Development.

As of 30 June 2018, New World Hotels (Holdings) is a wholly owned subsidiary of New World Development. Between 1999 and 2006, New World Hotels (Holdings) was known as NWD (Hotels Investments) Limited.

=== Hong Kong ===
Only 2 out of 5 hotels of New World Development–New World Hotels (Holdings) group in 1990 were survived as the current assets of New World Development. Despite NWD group also made 5 additions to their Hong Kong hotels portfolio, to a total of 7.

Hotel Victoria was closed down in 1995 and converted to the East Tower of Shun Tak Centre, now known as China Merchants Tower.

In August 2001, The Regent Hong Kong, which New World Development owned 75% stake at that time, was sold for HK$185 million.

New World Hotel, later known as Renaissance Kowloon Hotel after 1990s refurbishment, demolished in 2010 for New World Centre redevelopment project.

In 2013, New World Development attempted to list 3 hotels in Hong Kong to the public again as NW Hotel Investments. Two of them, Grand Hyatt Hong Kong and Renaissance Harbour View Hotel were originally owned by New World Hotels (Holdings). The last hotel, Hyatt Regency Tsim Sha Tsui, completed in 2007, was 100% owned by NWD at that time. However, the listing was collapsed.

Eventually, the 3 hotels were sold to a new joint venture in April 2015. The new JV was owned by Abu Dhabi Investment Authority (ADIA) and New World Development (via Beames Holdings) in a 50–50 ratio. The deal also included Chow Tai Fook Enterprises sold the 36% stakes in Grand Hyatt Hong Kong and Renaissance Harbour View to the new joint venture, leave only the 50% stake held via New World Development. ADIA paid HK$18.5 billion for the stake in the new JV, of which NWD group received HK$10 billion of them.

NWD currently also owned Hyatt Regency Sha Tin opened in 2011 and located in the Chinese University of Hong Kong, as well as Novotel Citygate Hong Kong, Rosewood Hong Kong and pentahotel Hong Kong.

=== Mainland China ===
After the privatization of New World Hotels (Holdings), another listed (from 1999 to 2016) subsidiary New World China Land of the group, became the sub-holding company for the hotel assets in the mainland China. However, it excluded the relic of New World Hotels (Holdings), such as Rosewood Beijing (former Jingguang New World), China Hotel and Grand New World Hotel in Xi'an which were owned by New World Development directly. In addition, New World Development only owned 20.5% stake of Jingguang New World, 9.0% of China Hotel and 22.4% of Grand New World Hotel as of 1999.

As of 2015, New World China Land owned 8 hotels, Moreover, hotels in Guangzhou, Hangzhou, Guilin, Xi'an and Suzhou of the NWD group, had been sold already. In addition, the Shanghai portfolio was replaced by New World Mayfair Hotel Shanghai (Chinese: 上海巴黎春天新世界酒店; lit. 'Shanghai "Paris spring" new world hotel') and pentahotel Shanghai, which were part of Shanghai Ramada Plaza, completed in 2002.

Moreover, the hotel management unit of the group, New World Hotel Management (BVI) Limited (trading as Rosewood Hotel Group), was sold by New World China Land to its privately owned parent company Chow Tai Fook Enterprises in July 2015. After another privatization of New World China Land in 2016, New World Development owned the hotel assets by itself.

In 2017, New World Mayfair Hotel Shanghai, along with pentahotel Shanghai, were sold for RMB1.85 billion.

On top of Rosewood Beijing in Jingguang Centre (former New World Beijing Hotel), NWD currently owned pentahotel Beijing (former Courtyard By Marriott New World) and the current New World Beijing Hotel on 8 Qinian Street, Chongwenmen, Wangfujing, Dongcheng District. The two other Chinese hotels of NWD Group, was located in Shunde and Wuhan respectively.

=== Rest of the world ===
In July 1997, some hotels outside Hong Kong, China and Southeast Asia, that were under a sub-holding company, Hotel Property Investments (BVI) Limited, were also sold by New World Hotels (Holdings) (at that time 64% owned by New World Development), to CTF Holdings, at that time owned by Henry Cheng (son of Cheng Yu-tung, the majority owner of Chow Tai Fook Enterprises and chairman New World Development) and his brother-in-law William Doo Wai-hoi. As of 30 June 2018, Hotel Property Investments (BVI) is 100% owned by Chow Tai Fook Enterprises, the flagship private holding company of Cheng family. The price was US$80 million (approx. HK$619 million). According to South China Morning Post, despite New World Development did not disclose the list of the hotels involved in the disposals, it was believed to be those hotels that were under the management of Renaissance and Ramada brands.

=== Other deals ===
The hotel management company, Renaissance Hotel Group N.V. (trading as Renaissance Hotels), which was a subsidiary of New World Hotels (Holdings) after the 1990 privatization, was also sold by New World Development to Marriott International in April 1997 for US$491 million (approx. HK$3.8 billion).

In 2015, New World Development acquired the remaining 36% stake of Beames Holdings, the parent company of New World Hotels (Holdings) from Chow Tai Fook Enterprises for HK$3.619 billion. Beames Holdings owned significant stakes in some hotels (Rosewood Beijing, Renaissance Riverside Hotel Saigon, New Word Hotel Saigon, New World Makati and the aforementioned new JV with ADIA) and other properties such as some floor area of Shun Tak Centre.
