= Hunter Sullivan =

American jazz musician (born 1965)

- Born: Hunter Sullivan; August 11, 1965 (age 60); Fort Worth, Texas
- Genres: Big Band, Jazz, Swing, Rock
- Occupations: Musician, Multi-instrumentalist, Singer, Bandleader
- Years active: 1990–present
- Member of: Hunter Sullivan Band
- Website: huntersullivan.com

Hunter Sullivan (born August 11, 1965) is a singer, songwriter, bandleader, and actor based in Dallas, Texas. He leads the Hunter Sullivan Big Band, a large jazz ensemble that specializes in classic jazz swing repertoire and the Great American Songbook. He has maintained a long-term residency at The Rosewood Mansion on Turtle Creek in Dallas for several years performing classic pop and romantic ballads with his small band.

Initially discovered by Dennis Hopper, Sullivan produced the King For A Day album with Bobby Darin's producer Nick Venet. The title track, composed by Sullivan and Richard Martin, was licensed for the motion picture Chooch and appeared on the movie's soundtrack. In 2004 he appeared with Lou Diamond Phillips in the film Striking Range. He also had a guest role as Undercover cop Georgie Velez on the “Suspicious Minds” episode of Walker, Texas Ranger. He has appeared on several regional talk shows and sings on numerous national radio jingles and commercials.

== Discography ==
- King for a Day (CD) (1998)
- At the Mansion (CD) (2006)
