= Leung Chin-man appointment controversy =

2008 corruption scandal in Hong Kong

The Leung Chin-man appointment controversy occurred in Hong Kong in August 2008, when the former Permanent Secretary for Housing, Planning and Lands, Leung Chin-man, was named Deputy Managing Director and executive director of New World China Land Ltd.

There was widespread suspicion among members of the public that job offer was a quid pro quo for the favours he allegedly granted to its parent company, New World Development (NWD), in 2004. The Civil Service Bureau (CSB), which was responsible for vetting the appointments of former civil servants against potential conflicts of interest, admitted to failing in their duty to consider all relevant factors.

== Background ==
In 2004, while Leung was Director of Housing, the government sold an unused Private Sector Participation Scheme project. The sale of the Hung Hom Peninsula HOS housing estate to NWD took place at less than half of the original asking price.

In November 2005, Leung was criticised in an Audit Commission report, for having exercised his discretionary power before conferring with other government departments in 2001. Henderson Land Development had been granted permission to exclude the public transport terminus from the gross floor area in its building plan for their Grand Promenade development, thus gaining additional revenues of HK$3.2 billion as a result of the decision. The effect was to allow the addition of 10,700 square meters to the project.

== Procedural rules ==
Extract from LC PaperNo. CB(1)1786/03-04(03)[5]

"Policy governing the acceptance of
post-retirement employment of civil servants"

The basic principle to follow in considering applications is that there should be no impropriety in the proposed employment. In this regard, the Administration takes into account the following factors –

- (a) whether the officer, while serving in the Government, was involved in policy formulation or decision which could have benefited his prospective employer;
- (b) whether the prospective employer might gain an unfair advantage over competitors because of the officer's previous knowledge and experience; and
- (c) the public perception of the officer taking up the proposed business or employment.

Directorate officers wishing to take up outside work, paid or unpaid, full-time or part-time, during their final leave period before their formal departure from the Government and/or within a specified control period counting from the said departure, should apply for prior permission from the Secretary for the Civil Service (SCS) in accordance with detailed arrangements set out in CSB Circular No. 10/2005. According to procedures drawn up, civil servants of Leung's grade are subject to a 12-month 'sterilisation period' and required government approval to take up private sector posts within three years of leaving. Procedures laid down required that views from the relevant bureaux be taken into account.

== Approval and conditions ==
The Secretary for the Civil Service, Denise Yue Chung-yee, signed off on the approval for him to take up the job after it passed through the Advisory committee on post-service employment of civil servants, responsible for vetting the appointment.

The Transport and Housing Bureau, the Development Bureau and Administrative Officer Grade Management were asked for their views. On receiving these submissions, the CSB prepared a paper for the Advisory committee to facilitate their consideration.

The view taken by the CSB was that Leung would oversee only mainland business of his future employer, and that bearing in mind he had ceased to be Director of Buildings for six years, and had left the post of Permanent Secretary of Housing two years previously, his appointment was "unlikely to present problems of conflict of interest". In order to address any potential public perception issue, additional conditions were imposed in addition to the standard set of conditions. Accordingly, Leung's employment was to be confined to New World China Land, not represent his employer in dealings with the Government, would refrain from involvement in any Hong Kong related dealings of his direct employer, and not to disclose sensitive or classified information to his employer. On 4 July 2008, the committee submitted its recommendation to the SCS to approve Leung's appointment, and the SCS duly gave her approval on 8 July, on the terms stipulated.

== Reaction ==
For many citizens, the incident was proof that there was collusion between the government and big business. Controversies surrounded not only the suspicions of Leung's own conflict of interest, but also of the insensitivity of the committee which recommended the approval for him to take up his new job with a HK$3.12 million pay packet, plus bonus, so soon after his retirement. Mr. Justice Pang Kin-kee, who chaired the vetting committee, was also himself criticised for conflict of interest for his close friendship with Leung. Political scientist Ma Ngok said "It is inevitable that the public will consider the advisory committee to be just a rubber stamp when the approval rate was 100%." Albert Cheng commented: "[the] controversial appointment is a political time bomb, which threatens to seriously undermine the authority of the administration." Senior Non-Expatriate Officers Association chairman Poon Wai-ming argued that the controversy arose from a lack of strict enforcement of the procedures, and not their inadequacies. New World argued that they hired Leung in good faith after government clearance. Albert Chan of the League of Social Democrats and 50 members of the public filed a complaint with the Independent Commission Against Corruption days after his appointment became public.

The Secretary for the Civil Service came under fire for approving an appointment that gives the strong appearance of a conflict of interest. Chief Executive Donald Tsang asked the Secretary for the Civil Service to account for the approval process in a written report.

On 13 August 2008, Apple Daily reported that the Hong Kong and Macao Affairs Office had asked the Hong Kong government to solve the problem on or before 24 August, and that the best way forward would be for Leung to resign from NWD. However, The Standard reports that the Apple assertions "could not be substantiated". However, an unnamed top Beijing official in Hong Kong was quoted in the South China Morning Post as warning, without specifically identifying the subject he was referring to, that conflicts among interest groups may threaten Hong Kong's stability if not properly handled.

== SCS report ==
On 15 August, the Civil Service Bureau issued the report requested by Donald Tsang where they admitted that they had not considered Leung's role in the Hung Hom Peninsula affair when approving his application, and was thus not mentioned in the report to the Advisory Committee or the subsequent submission to the SCS. Although the Works branch and the Transport and Housing branch suggested that there may be a "public perception issue", neither believed that the appointment was "[likely to].. create a negative impact or embarrass the government" because his role was in mainland subsidiary. Donald Tsang asked the SCS to reassess the approval, and submit a report to him.

New World Development announced in the early hours of 16 August that Leung had resigned from his post, and would not be seeking compensation from the government, for its "inappropriate handling". Leung professed his "shock" to learn that officials had not considered his role in the Hung Hom Peninsula sale, and tendered his resignation. It was understood that the reassessment by the SCS would take place notwithstanding Leung's resignation.

== Political fallout ==
Yue lost credibility within and outside government circles as a result of the case, but said she hoped to stay in her position. Commentator Chris Yeung stated that Tsang's request for the bureaux to do their job again deals a body blow to the authority and image of Yue and the bureaux. A SCMP editorial criticised the "glaring lack of political sense of some of our senior officials." Lee Wing-tat said it was clear from the episode that the government considered the public stupid. Albert Cheng pointed to the composition of the four-man Advisory committee, saying that issues would have been flagged had it included pan-democrats instead of just establishment figures.

There were only muted calls for Secretary's resignation. Commentators suggested that parties feared that demands for Yue's resignation would alienate civil servants in the forthcoming LegCo elections.

The next day, Donald Tsang confirmed that Denise Yue would not have to resign. He was satisfied with her apology and with the explanations offered by her. Tsang ordered a committee, of which Yue was to be a member, to be set up to perform a sweeping review of the system to process applications for former civil servants. This sparked fears among civil servants that their job opportunities after retirement would be curtailed.

In an op-ed, Christopher Cheung states that Leung was quickly sentenced by the court of public opinion, and was "dangerously close to mob rule". The facts of the case rested on guidelines introduced in January 2006 which "elevate public opinion to the level of tyranny", and whose rigid entry and exit criteria from the civil service stand in the way of modernising the civil service.
