= Chow Chi-yuen =

Hong Kong entrepreneur

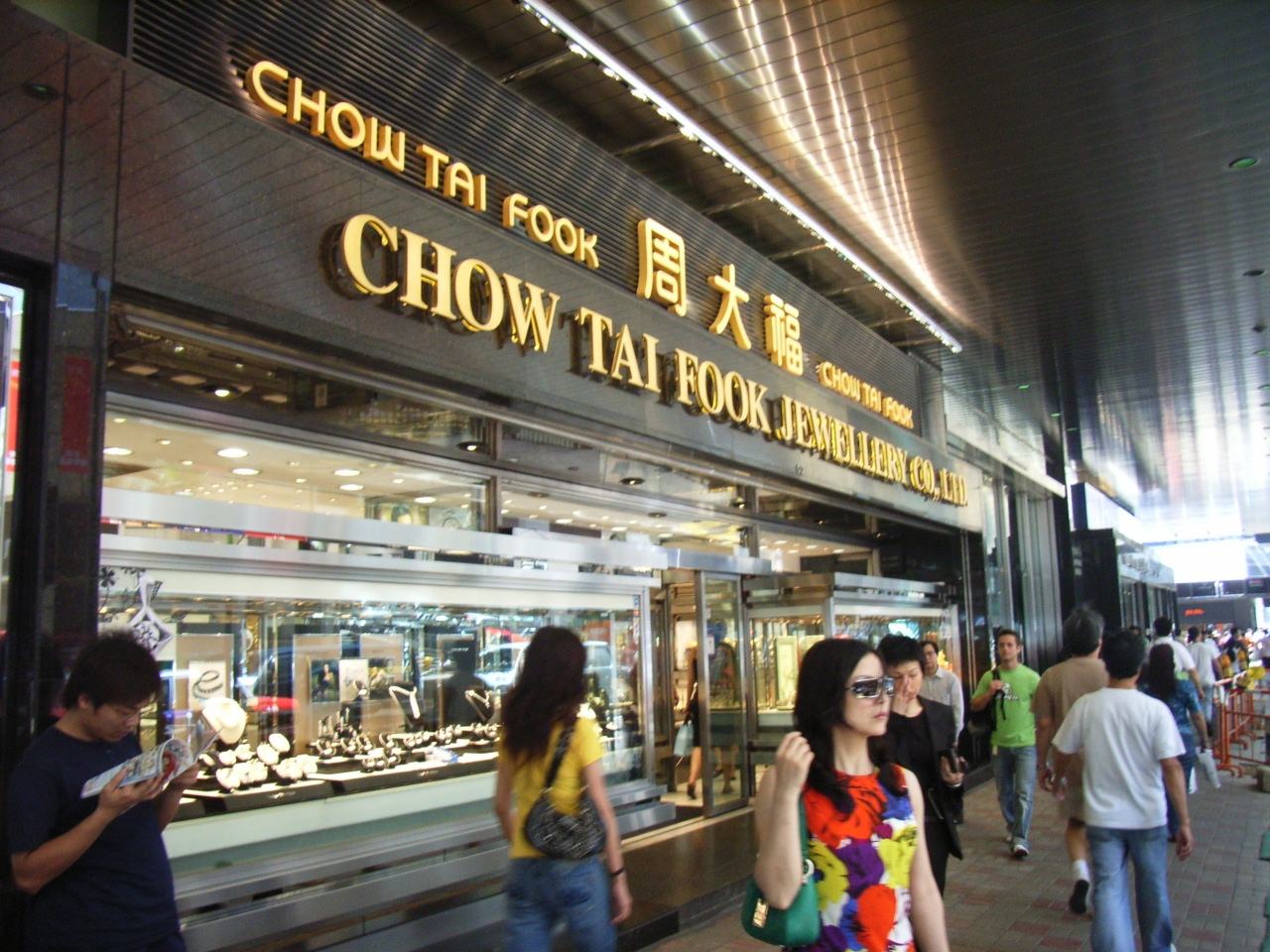
Chow Tai Fook Jewellery shop on Queen's Road Central, Hong Kong

Chow Chi-yuen (Chinese: 周至元; Jyutping: zau1 zi3 jyun4; pinyin: Zhōu Zhìyuán; 1900–1971) was a Hong Kong entrepreneur and the founder of Chow Tai Fook. He was the father-in-law of Cheng Yu-tung (鄭裕彤), chairman of New World Development, and was born in Shunde, Guangdong, China.

Chow set up his first "Chow Tai Fook" shop in Guangzhou (Canton) in 1929 to sell traditional gold accessories. In 1931, the shop was relocated to Macau during the Second Sino-Japanese War. In 1946, Chow established the first branch in Queen's Road Central, Hong Kong. In 1956, Cheng Yu-tung, Chow's son-in-law, took over Chow's business. Cheng expanded Chow Tai Fook's business to jewellery retailing in 1960.
