= Wuhan Chow Tai Fook Finance Centre =

Skyscraper under construction in Wuhan, China

Wuhan CTF Finance Centre
- 武汉周大福金融中心
- Etymology: Chow Tai Fook, the parent company of New World China

General information
- Status: Under construction
- Type: Hotel; Commercial; Office
- Location: Wuhan, China
- Groundbreaking: 24 July 2021
- Construction started: 24 May 2022
- Estimated completion: 2029

Height
- Architectural: 475 m (1,558 ft)

Technical details
- Floor count: 84

Design and construction
- Architect: Ronald Lu & Partners
- Developer: New World China; (subsidiary of NWD group)
- Structural engineer: Arup
- Quantity surveyor: Rider Levett Bucknall

Wuhan CTF Finance Centre also known as Wuhan Chow Tai Fook Finance Centre (simplified Chinese: 武汉周大福金融中心; traditional Chinese: 武漢周大福金融中心) is a supertall skyscraper under construction in Wuhan, Hubei, China. The tower was originally set to be China's tallest, surpassing the Shanghai Tower when completed in 2026, but its height was later reduced to 475 meters.

The skyscraper will accommodate office space. The building complex willalso include four residential blocks, a three-storey retail space, and basement parking and retail space over five levels. The shopping mall would be under NWD group's K11 brand.

== See also ==
- List of tallest buildings in Wuhan
- List of tallest buildings in China
- Wuhan Greenland Center
- Wuhan Center
