= Jing Guang Centre =

Skyscraper in Beijing, China

- 京广中心
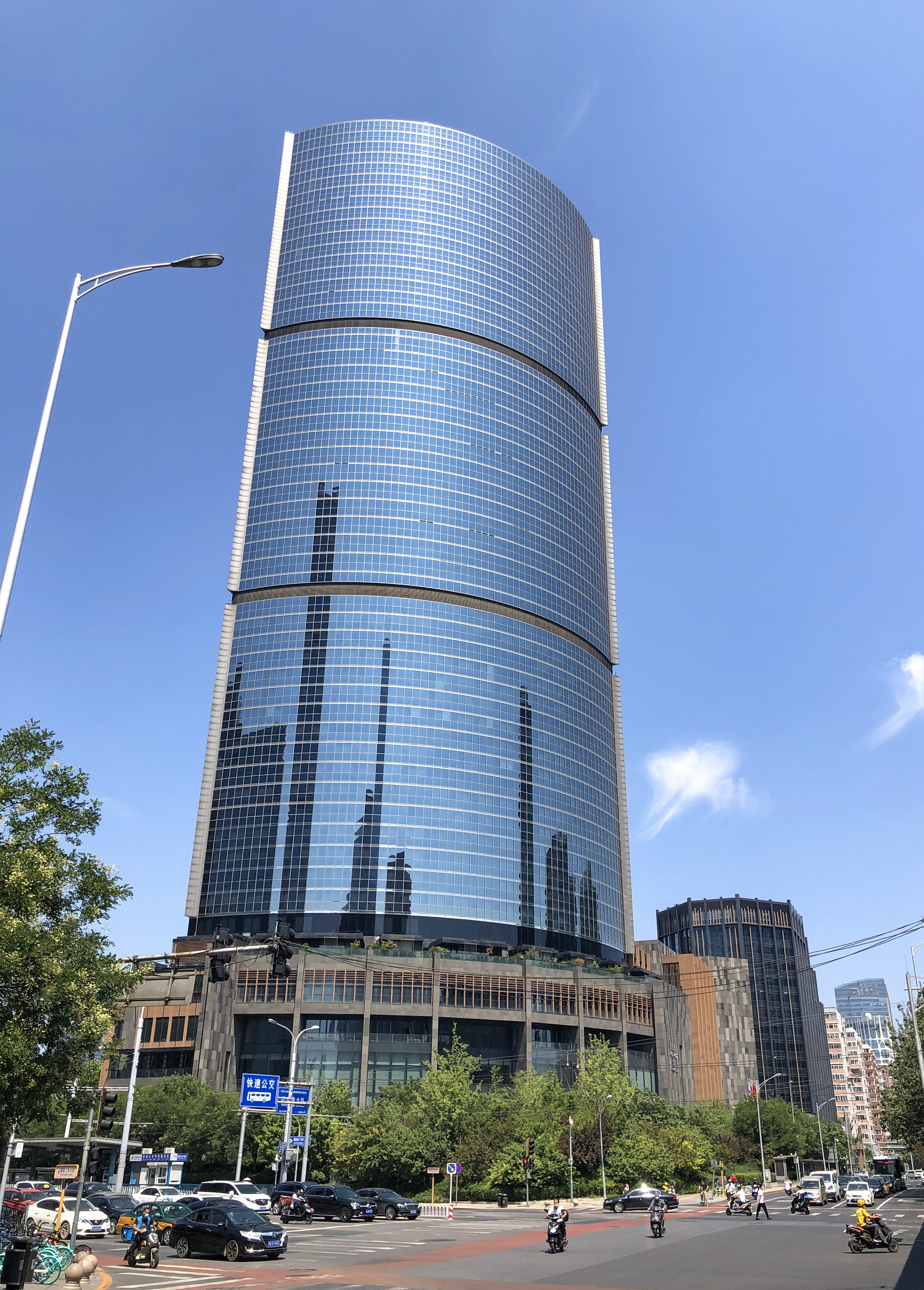

- Location within Beijing Jing Guang Centre (Beijing)

General information
- Location: 1 Chaoyangmen Outer Street, Hujialou Subdistrict, Chaoyang District, Beijing, China
- Coordinates: 39°55′08″N 116°27′16″E
- Completed: 1989
- Owner: New World Development

Height
- Height: 208 m (682 ft)

Website
- jingguangcentre.com

The Jing Guang Centre (simplified Chinese: 京广中心; traditional Chinese: 京廣中心; pinyin: Jīng-Guǎng Zhōngxīn, an abbreviation for "Beijing-Guangzhou Centre") is a 208 m (682 ft) skyscraper in Beijing CBD which was the tallest building in Beijing from 1989 to 2006.

The Jing Guang Centre was also the tallest building in mainland China from completion in 1989 until 1996, when King Tower in Shanghai and Shenzhen's Shun Hing Square were completed. The main tower is composed of 3 parts: hotel, offices and condominium, with a side building of additional office space on the northern side.

== Rosewood Beijing Hotel ==
The hotel section of the centre was originally the Jing Guang New World Hotel Beijing (Chinese: 北京京廣新世界酒店). The hotel was closed and refurbished in 2012–2013 to become the Rosewood Beijing Hotel. As of 2018 Rosewood Beijing was still owned by listed company New World Development, but managed by private company Rosewood Hotel Group. Rosewood Hotel Group owns both Rosewood Hotels & Resorts and New World brands.

Another New World Beijing Hotel was opened in Wangfujing, on 8 Qinian Street, Chongwenmen, Dongcheng District.
