= China Hotel =

Hotel in Guangzhou, Guangdong, China

Coordinates: 23°8′32.54″N 113°15′19.20″E

- Simplified Chinese: 中国大酒店
- Traditional Chinese: 中國大酒店
Transcriptions
Standard Mandarin
- Hanyu Pinyin: Zhōngguó Dà Jiǔdiàn
Yue: Cantonese
- Jyutping: zung1 gwok3 daai6 zau2 dim3

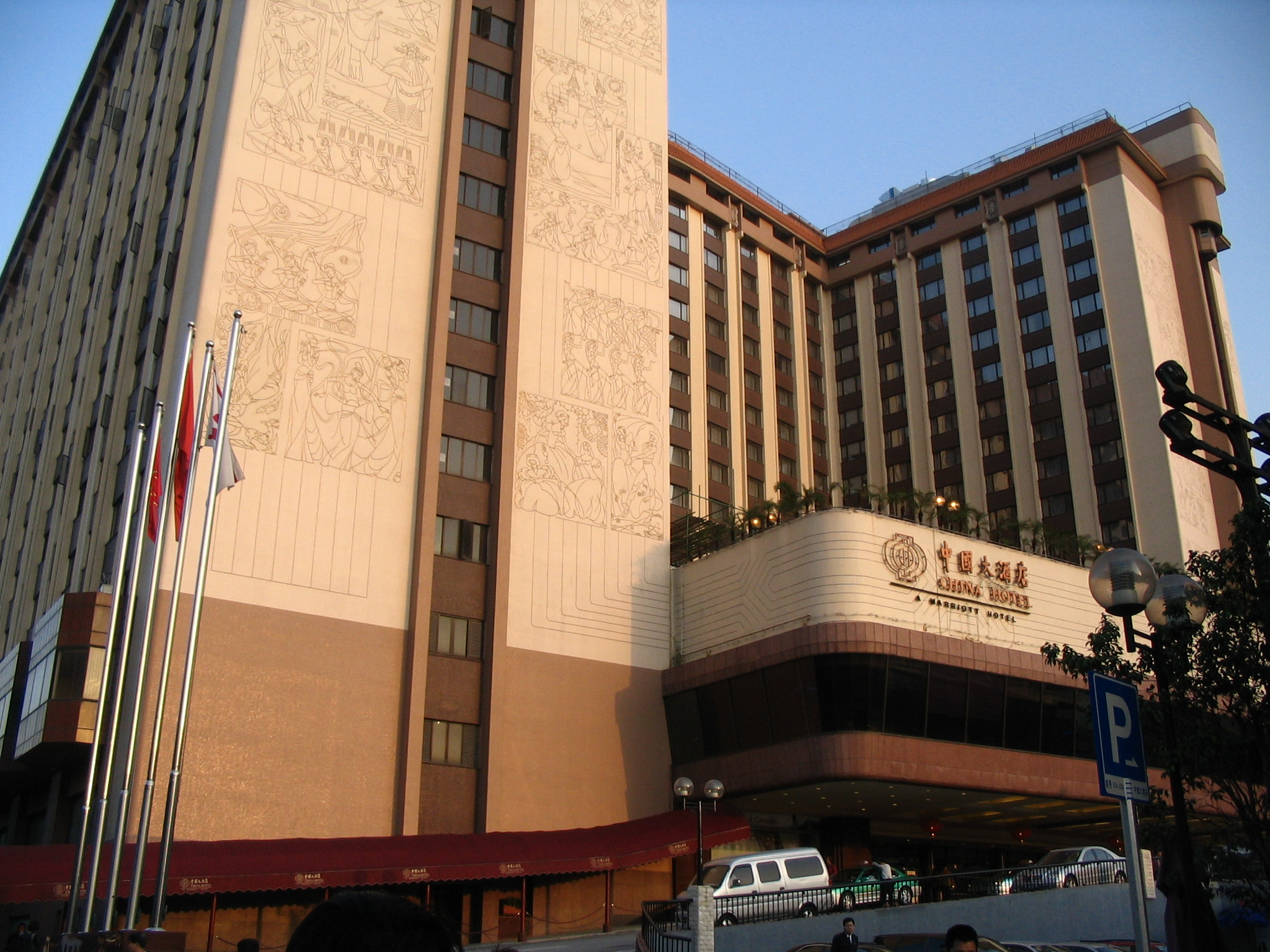
China Hotel

China Hotel (Chinese: 中国大酒店) is a 5-star hotel in Guangzhou, Guangdong, China.

== History ==
China's first 5-star hotel and the first involving foreign capital, the China Hotel was built in 1984 by the Hong Kong-listed conglomerate Hopewell Holdings Ltd (controlled by Sir Gordon Wu) under a novel contractual agreement that came to be known as Build-Operate-Transfer, a means of building and operating joint ventures with local authorities in China. This arrangement allowed a foreign partner to build a facility at its own expense, operated it for an agreed length of time to generate a return on its investment, then hand it over to a local partner at no cost. New World Development, via its subsidiary New World Hotels (Holdings), also owned a minority stake.

China Hotel became the first hotel managed by Marriott in Mainland China in 1998, under a 20-year contract and was renamed China Hotel, A Marriott Hotel. It left Marriott at the end of the contract on October 31, 2018. The hotel is currently owned by Guangzhou Lingnan International Enterprise Group Co. Ltd. In 2008, the hotel was fully renovated and offers 850 guest rooms.
