= Sonia Cheng =

Hong Kong businesswoman and socialite

- Chinese: 鄭志雯
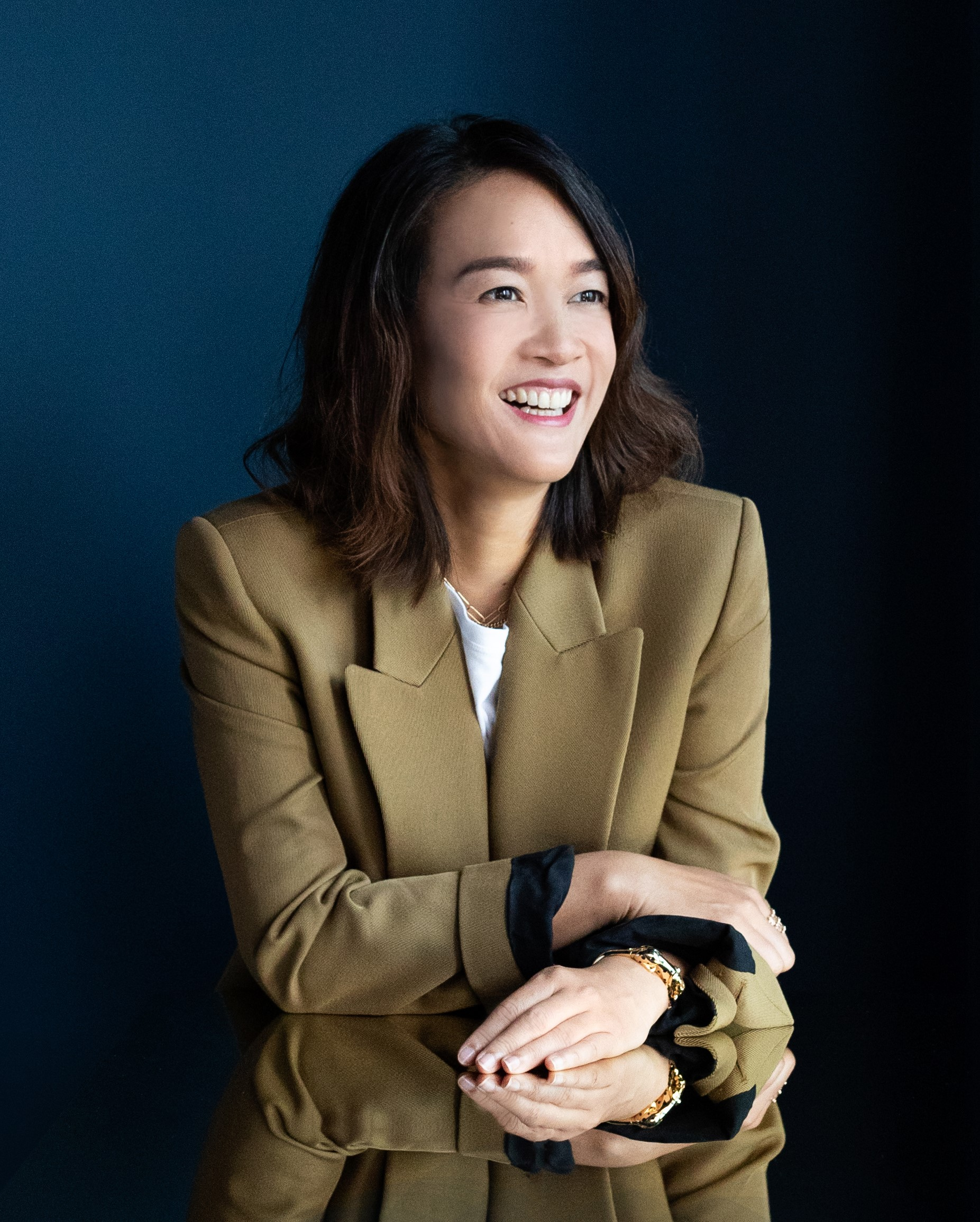
- Born: 1980 (age 45–46); Hong Kong
- Education: Harvard College
- Occupation: Businesswoman
- Known for: CEO of Rosewood Hotel Group
- Spouse: Paulo Pong
- Children: 5
- Father: Henry Cheng

Sonia Cheng Chi-Man (traditional Chinese: 鄭志雯; simplified Chinese: 郑志雯) is a Hong Kong business executive. She is the CEO of Rosewood Hotel Group and the executive director of the New World Development. She is also the vice-chairman of Chow Tai Fook Jewellery Group. She was also appointed as an independent non-executive director of The Hongkong and Shanghai Banking Corporation and a director of Primavera Capital Acquisition Corporation. She is the daughter of Hong Kong property developer Henry Cheng and granddaughter of real estate and jewelry billionaire Cheng Yu-tung.

== Early life and education ==
Cheng was born in 1980. She is the second child of Henry Cheng. The executive Adrian Cheng is her brother. She studied at St. Paul's Co-educational College in Hong Kong and Taft School in the United States. She holds a Bachelor of Arts from Harvard University.

== Career ==
Cheng joined Morgan Stanley and Warburg Pincus working in their U.S. and Hong Kong offices. In 2008, she joined New World Group and became chief executive of Rosewood Hotel Group.

Cheng joined Chow Tai Fook Jewellery Group in April 2019 as a non-executive director, she became an executive director in April 2021 and became vice-chairman and executive director in June 2022.

Cheng holds several board positions. She is the chairman of the advisory committee of the School of Hotel and Tourism Management at The Chinese University of Hong Kong and The Hong Kong Polytechnic University. She was also a Council Member of the Chinese University of Hong Kong.

Cheng was listed on the International Hospitality Institute Global 100: 100 Most Powerful People in Global Hospitality in 2022. She was on Fortune's 40 under 40 in 2018 Cheng was also on Asia's 50 Power Businesswomen in 2015 & 2016

== Personal life ==
Cheng has been involved in the New World Development and Chow Tai Fook charity projects in Hong Kong and mainland China.

She is married to Paulo Pong Kin-Yee and has four children.
