= Leung Chin-man =

Leung Chin-man JP

Permanent Secretary for Housing, Planning and Lands (Housing)
- In office July 2002 – 10 January 2006

Personal details
- Born: 22 November 1945 (age 80) Hong Kong
- Profession: civil servant

Chinese name
- Chinese: 梁展文
- Hanyu Pinyin: Liáng Zhǎnwén
- Yale Romanization: Lèuhng Jínmàhn
- Jyutping: Loeng4 Zin2man4

Leung Chin-man JP (梁展文, born 22 November 1945) is a retired senior civil servant in the Government of Hong Kong the former Permanent Secretary for Housing, Planning and Lands.

== Government career ==
Leung first joined the Immigration Department in October 1966, and joined the Administrative Service in October 1976.

Leung served as Director of Community Relations of the ICAC from July 1988 to May 1991; Deputy Secretary for Constitutional Affairs from May 1991 to July 1994. He was posted to Toronto in July 1994 to be the Director of the Hong Kong Economic and Trade Office. On his return from Canada, he was made Deputy Secretary for Housing from September 1997 to August 1999 and Director of Buildings from August 1999 to June 2002. In July 2002, Leung became Permanent Secretary for Housing, Planning and Lands (Housing).

Leung took leave from the civil service on 28 November 2005, ceased active service in January 2006, and retired officially on 10 January 2007. Leung was appointed Justice of the Peace on 1 July 2007. Since retiring, Leung was appointed Director or mainland-based Fineland Real Estate Holding, and PuraPharm International HK

== Controversies ==
=== Hung Hom Peninsula housing estate ===
While Leung was Director of Housing, the government sold a disused but never previously occupied Private Sector Participation Scheme project. The Hung Hom Peninsula project was sold for a below-market land premium of HK$864 million to New World Development (NWD), who subsequently sold off half share to Sun Hung Kai Properties. In 2004, the consortium announced the demolition of these buildings to make way for luxury apartments. The huge popular outcry about this needless destruction of "perfectly good buildings" to satisfy "corporate greed" resulted in an unprecedented about-turn: the developers withdrew the plan on 10 December 2004.

=== Grand Promenade development ===
Henderson Land Development won a tender for a site in Sai Wan Ho for Grand Promenade with a land premium of HK$2.43 billion in January 2001. Six months later, the developer successfully applied for and was granted permission to exclude the public transport terminus from the gross floor area in its building plan. Leung had exempted the area of a public transport terminus in the gross floor area calculation of the development. The effect was to allow the addition of 10,700 square meters to the project and doubling the number of apartments from 1,008 to 2,020, costing the government HK$125 million in lost revenue. A November 2005 Audit Commission report criticised Leung for having exercised his discretionary power before conferring with other government departments, thus handing the developer additional revenues of HK$3.2 billion in exchange for a land premium of $6 million. Leung tabled a judicial review. The two sides reached a deal in May 2006 when the Commissioner dropped legal proceedings, and Leung abandoned his judicial review. The government drew fire for dropping its case.

=== Post-civil service appointment ===
In July 2008, Leung was named deputy managing director and executive director of New World China Land, subsidiary of NWD. After a 12-month 'sterilisation period' after retirement, Leung submitted an application to the government on 9 May for approval to take up employment with New World China Land. The Secretary for the Civil Service, Denise Yue Chung-yee, signed off on the approval for him to take up the job after his request passed through the vetting committee.

There was uproar amidst widespread suspicion among members of the public that job offer was a quid pro quo for the favours he apparently granted to NWD in 2004. Controversies surrounded not only the suspicions of Leung's own conflict of interest, but also of the insensitivity of the committee which recommended the approval for him to take up his new job with a HK$3.12 million pay packet less than two years after his official retirement. New World argued that they hired Leung in good faith after government clearance.

On 15 August, the Civil Service Bureau admitted that it had not considered Leung's role in the Hung Hom Peninsula affair when approving his appointment. Donald Tsang asked the SCS to reassess the approval, and submit a report to him.

NWD announced in the early hours of 16 August that Leung had resigned from his post. Leung professed his "shock" to learn that officials had not considered his role in the Hung Hom Peninsula sale, and said he would not be seeking compensation from the government, for its "inappropriate handling". The Secretary for the Civil Service apologised for the poor handling of the case, which seriously undermined the authority and credibility of the Civil Service Bureau.

== See also ==
- Politics of Hong Kong

Preceded by Tony Miller	Permanent Secretary for Housing, Planning and Lands (Housing); July 2002 to January 2006	Succeeded by Thomas Chan Chun-yuen
