= Penta Hotels =

Hotel chain

- Type: subsidiary
- Industry: Hospitality
- Founded: Frankfurt, Germany (1971)
- Founders: Joint venture between Lufthansa, Swissair, Alitalia, BOAC, and BEA
- Headquarters: Frankfurt, Germany
- Areas served: Asia, Europe
- Parent: Centrifuge Holding GmbH
- Website: www.pentahotels.com

Penta Hotels is a hotel brand with 15 hotels across Europe and Asia as of 2025.

== Business overview ==
Penta's hotels feature Penta PlayerPad Rooms featuring gaming consoles and other arcades facilities. The brand also pioneered the "check in at the bar" concept. The hotels feature a combination of a lobby and a lounge designed to encourage guests to spend leisure time there.

== History ==
=== Original Penta Hotels chain ===
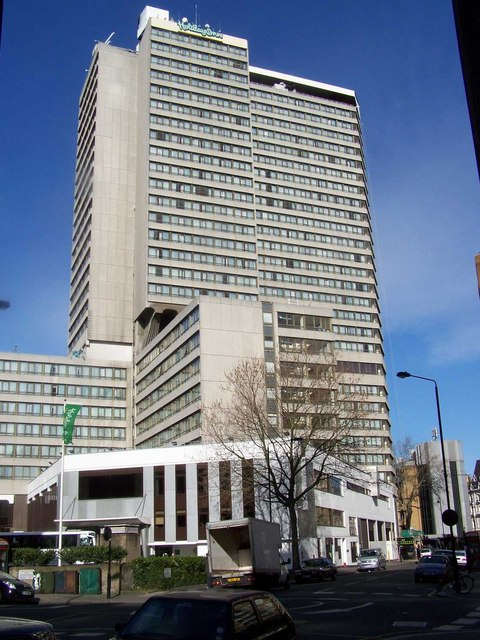
Holiday Inn London – Kensington Forum, opened July 2, 1973 as the London Penta Hotel

The company was established in 1971 as Penta Hotels. It was named Penta because it was a joint venture of five airlines, Lufthansa, Swissair, Alitalia, BOAC and BEA. The hotels were located in major gateway cities where the airlines flew, to offer accommodations to passengers and flight crew members from the partner airlines. In 1984, Lufthansa bought a controlling interest in the chain from British Airways, which had been formed in 1974 by the merger of BOAC and BEA. In 1993, German investor Dieter Bock, CEO of Lonrho, one of the chain's owners, arranged its sale to Hong Kong businessman Cheng Yu-tung. Renaissance Hotels acquired the management rights of 12 Penta hotels in Europe, and held the rights of nine hotels in 1994, at which point the use of the Penta name was phased out.

=== Modern Pentahotels chain ===
Rosewood Hotel Group (at that time known as New World Hospitality, a subsidiary of New World China Land until ) relaunched Pentahotels in 2007 with renovations to their properties in Europe. The Italian designer Matteo Thun created the hotel chain's interior design.

Pentahotel Shanghai was opened in October 2008 by New World China Land's New World Hotel Management Limited. In 2011, The Courtyard by Marriott Beijing was converted into pentahotel Beijing.

The Reading, Berkshire hotel was Pentahotels' first UK location and opened in 2009. In 2013, Pentahotels opened its first location in Hong Kong, and its second one in 2016.

Chow Tai Fook group, via a subsidiary CTF Development, acquired 5 hotels in Belgium in April 2013. The hotels would be managed by Pentahotels after renovation. 2015 as a Penta hotel opened in Brussels. Chow Tai Fook is the ultimate parent company of Rosewood Hotel Group, which privatized the hotel group in 2015.

In December 2013 Rosewood Hotel Group acquired Pentahotels' European operation, which incorporated in Germany as Penta Hotels Germany GmbH and Penta Hotel Holdings Limited in the BVI for €13.5 million, from Chow Tai Fook. However, Chow Tai Fook privatized the whole hotel group in 2015.

In 2016, Pentahotels launched the PentaPlayer Pad, a room type designed for gamers with a PlayStation 4, a pinball, and a gamer-themed design. The brand also launched its first location in France in Roissy-en-France. Pentahotels launched its repositioning in 2017 amidst stated plans for global expansion. Pentahotels announced its first Thai hotel with an opening planned for 2020. In May 2020, Rogier Braakman was named president of Pentahotels. The Moscow location opened in February 2019.

As of 2020, Pentahotels was operated by Penta Hotels Worldwide GmbH, a subsidiary of 360 Operator GmbH. The ultimate owner was Centrifuge Holding GmbH.

In May 2026, 11 of the chain's 15 hotels were sold by German real estate company Aroundtown SA to American real estate investment firm Ironstone Group and London-based Ogilvy Management for €275 million. They will be operated by Luxembourg-based operator Bralower & Loewe Hospitality Partners under long-term franchise agreements. They will rebrand under the management of IHG Hotels & Resorts in early 2027. This will leave Pentahotels with only 4 properties.

== See also ==
- List of chained-brand hotels
