= King Fook Holdings =

King Fook Holdings Limited 景福集團有限公司
- Company type: Listed company
- Industry: Jewellery
- Founded: 1949; 77 years ago
- Headquarters: Hong Kong Island, Hong Kong
- Area served: Hong Kong
- Key people: Chairman: Mr. Yeung Ping-leung, Howard
- Parent: Miramar Hotel and Investment
- Website: www.kingfook.com

King Fook Holdings Limited (Chinese: 景福集團有限公司) (SEHK: 280) is a holding company engaging in jewellery retailing and wholesaling operations in Hong Kong. Its businesses cover gold ornaments, jewellery, watch, fashion and gift retailing, bullion trading, securities brokerage and diamond wholesaling.

The company was established in 1949. It was listed on the Hong Kong Stock Exchange in 1988. Its subsidiary companies include King Fook Gold & Jewellery Company Limited (景福金銀珠寶有限公司), King Fook Jewellery Group Limited (景福珠寶集團有限公司) and King Fook Securities Company Limited (景福證券有限公司).

King Fook Securities Company Limited (founded 1971) ceased its operation on July 31, 2013 due to consistent losses in successive prior financial years.
