= Rosewood Bangkok =

Coordinates: 13.74338°N 100.54976°E

Rosewood Bangkok (Thai: โรสวูด กรุงเทพฯ)
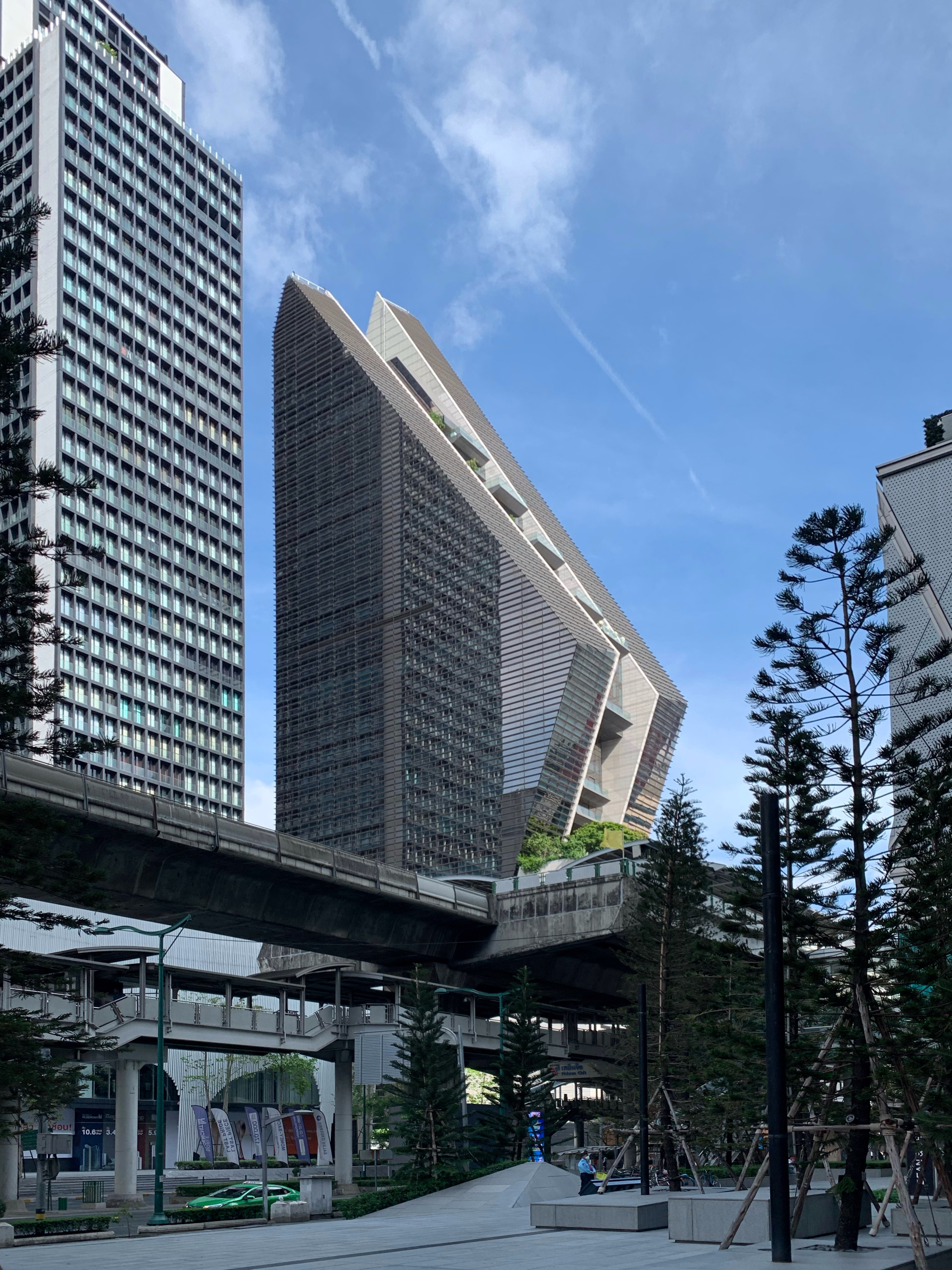
- Rosewood Bangkok as seen from the front entrance of the Park Ventures
- Interactive map of the Rosewood Bangkok (Thai: โรสวูด กรุงเทพฯ) area

General information
- Status: Open
- Type: Hotel
- Location: Lumphini Subdistrict, Bangkok, Thailand
- Construction started: 2014
- Completed: 2019
- Opened: 31 March 2019
- Owner: Rende Development
- Management: Rosewood Hotels & Resorts

Height
- Architectural: Tandem Architects (Executive Architect), Celia Chu Design (Interior Designer), AvroKO (Restaurant Interior Designer)

Technical details
- Floor count: 30
- Floor area: 24,000 m^{2} (258,000 sq ft)

Design and construction
- Architect: Kohn Pedersen Fox Associates (KPF)

Renovating team
- Awards and prizes: Future: Leisure Led Development (World Architecture Festival 2015), Best Futura Project - Gold (MIPIM Asia 2014)

Website
- www.rosewoodhotels.com/en/bangkok

Rosewood Bangkok is a luxury hotel within Bangkok's central business district along Ploenchit Road, managed by Rosewood Hotels & Resorts. The hotel features 159 guestrooms, three restaurants, a roof bar and conference rooms. It was designed by Kohn Pedersen Fox with Tandem Architects as executive architect and Celia Chu Design Associates as interior designer. The building provides direct access to the adjacent Phloen Chit BTS station.
