= New World Department Store China =

- Company type: Listed company
- Traded as: SEHK: 825
- Industry: Department stores
- Founded: 1993
- Headquarters: Hong Kong
- Area served: Mainland China
- Key people: Chairman: Mr. Henry Cheng Executive Director and the Chief Executive Officer: Ms. Woo Yuk-kwan Rebecca
- Parent: New World Development

Chinese name
- Simplified Chinese: 新世界百货中国
- Traditional Chinese: 新世界百貨中國
- Hanyu Pinyin: Xīn-shìjiè bǎihuò zhōngguó
Transcriptions
Standard Mandarin
- Hanyu Pinyin: Xīn-shìjiè bǎihuò zhōngguó
- Website: www.nwds.com.hk

New World Department Store China Limited is a Hong Kong–based holding company for department store chains in the Mainland China. New World Department Store China is a subsidiary of another listed company New World Development. It has self-owned stores and managed stores in mainland China and in the past in Hong Kong. It operates under two brands: "New World" (Chinese: 新世界) and Ba-li Chun-tian (Chinese: 巴黎春天; pinyin: Bālí chūntiān; lit. 'Paris Spring'). The chairman is Henry Cheng, the son of the Hong Kong billionaire, Cheng Yu-tung. It was listed on the Stock Exchange of Hong Kong with IPO price of HK$5.8 per share.

== See also ==
- New World China Land
