= Rosewood Hotels & Resorts =

International hotel and resort chain

Rosewood Hotels and Resorts, LLC
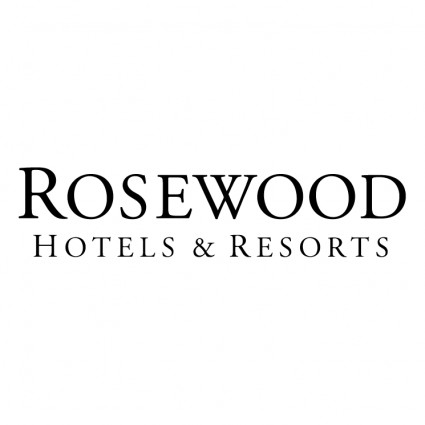
- Trade name: Rosewood Hotels & Resorts
- Type: Subsidiary
- Industry: Hospitality
- Founded: 1979; 47 years ago in Dallas, Texas
- Founder: Caroline Rose Hunt
- Headquarters: Hong Kong
- Area served: Worldwide
- Key people: Sonia Cheng (CEO); Radha Arora (President)
- Parent: Rosewood Hotel Group
- Website: rosewoodhotels.com

Rosewood Hotels & Resorts is an international luxury hotel and resort company founded in Dallas in 1979 by Caroline Rose Hunt, the daughter of oil tycoon H. L. Hunt. Currently owned by Hong Kong–based Rosewood Hotel Group which also owns New World Hotels & Resorts, Carlyle & Co. and Asaya. Rosewood Hotels & Resorts currently operates 38 hotels in 23 countries/regions and has 21 hotels slated for future development.

== History ==
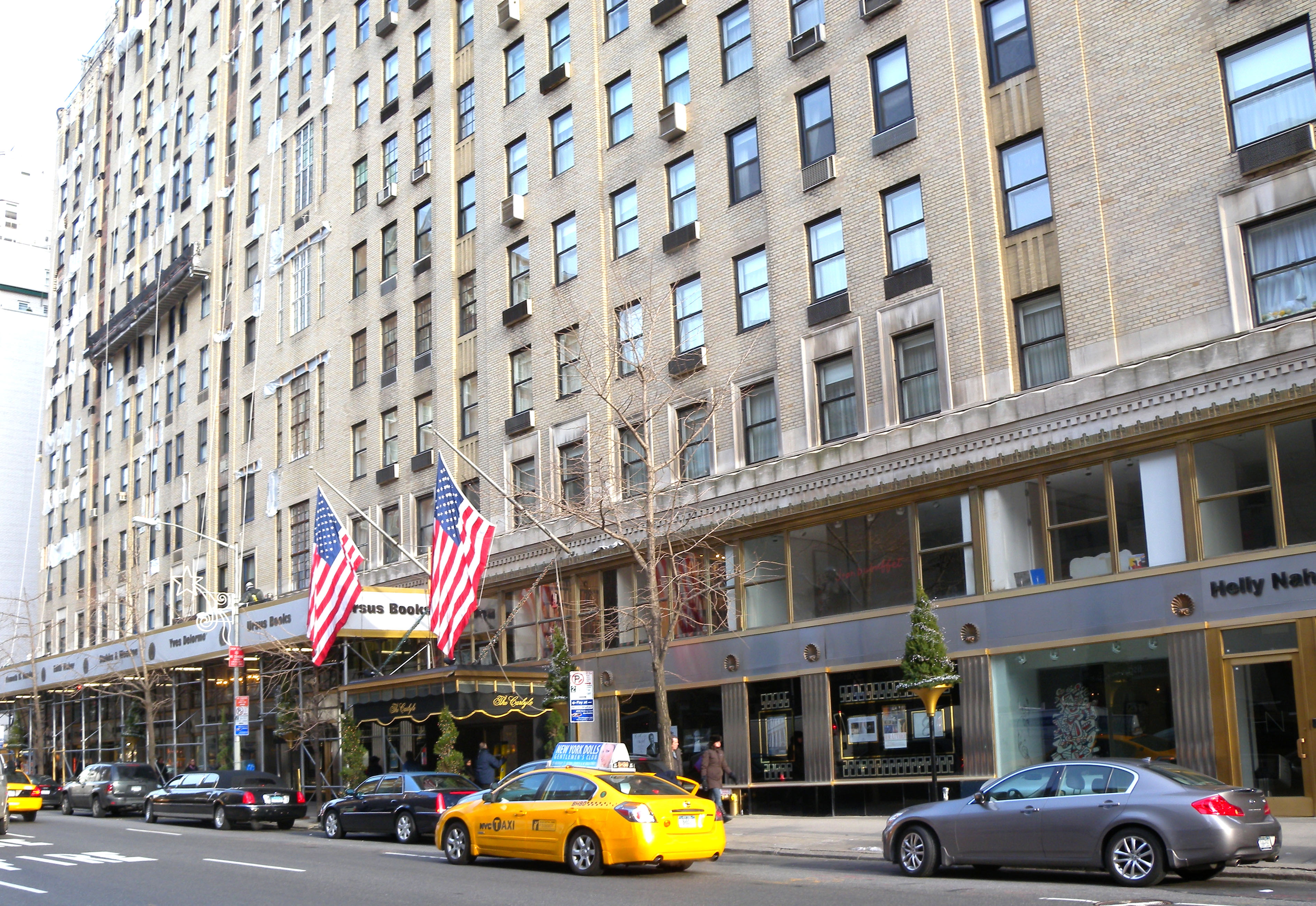
The Carlyle, A Rosewood Hotel in New York City

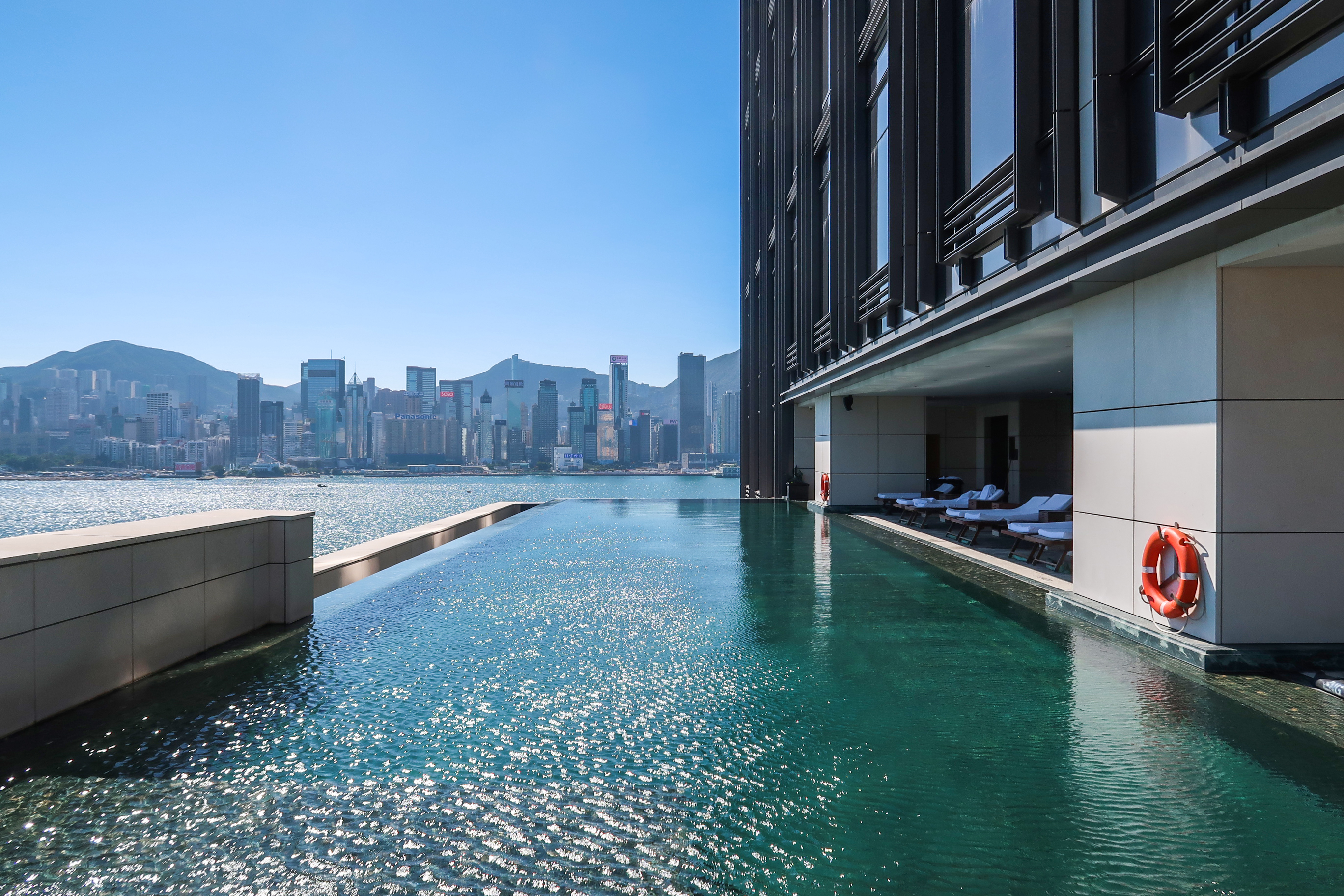
Rosewood Hong Kong

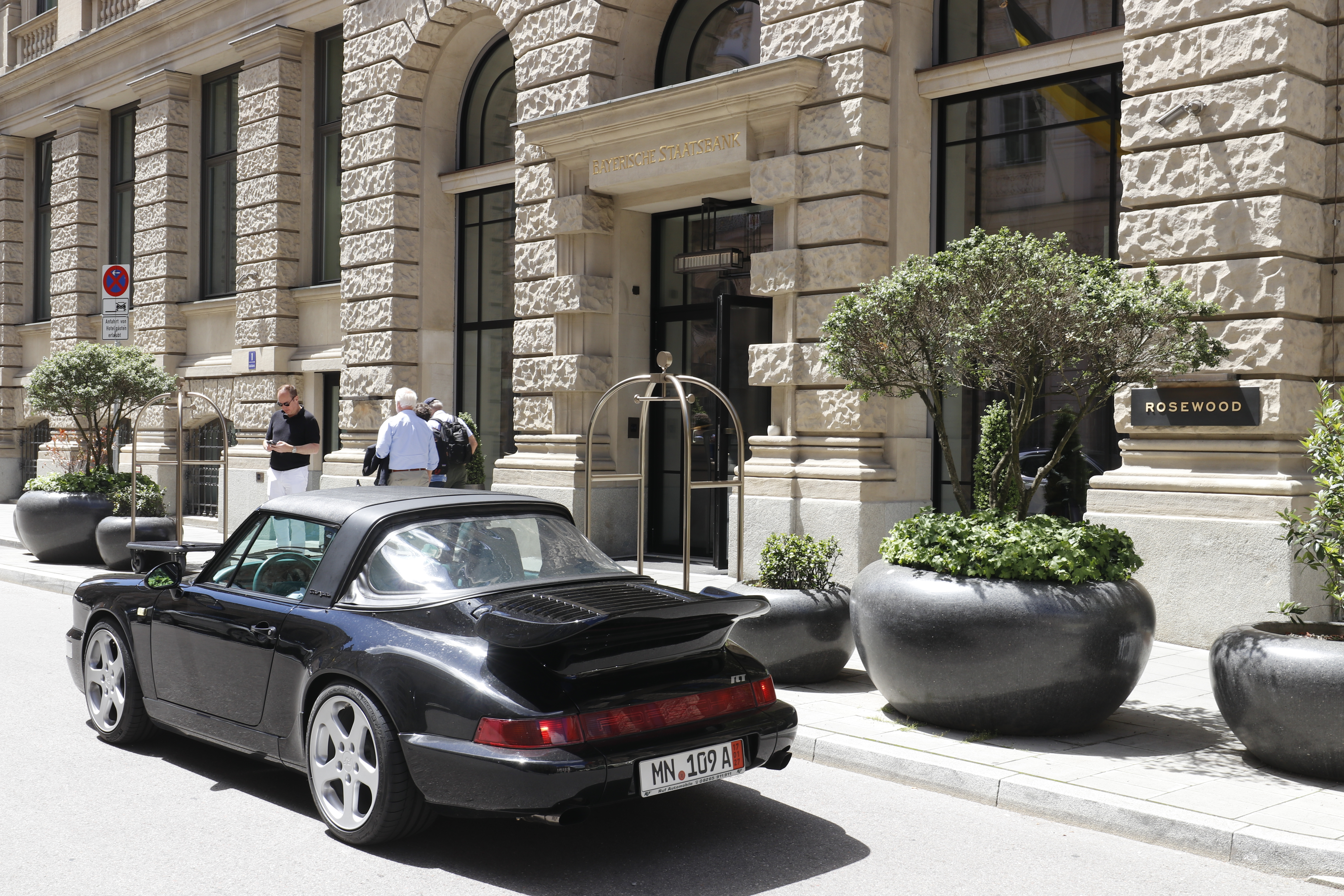
Rosewood Hotel Munich, 2026

=== Foundation ===
Rosewood was founded in Dallas by Caroline Rose Hunt in 1979. A year later, Hunt converted the mansion of Texas cotton magnate Sheppard King into Rosewood's first hotel, The Mansion on Turtle Creek, located in the upscale Turtle Creek neighborhood.

=== Acquisition ===
Hong Kong–based company Rosewood Hotel Group (formerly New World Hospitality and rebranded in May 2013) is a subsidiary of Chow Tai Fook Enterprises, a privately owned Hong Kong–based company. Previously, Rosewood Hotel Group was the hotel management arm of New World China Land, a subsidiary of New World Group. The company announced in June 2011 that it had signed a purchase and sale agreement to acquire Rosewood Hotels & Resorts from Rosewood Corp. and Maritz, Wolff & Co. The Chief Executive Officer of Rosewood Hotel Group, Sonia Cheng. The deal was completed on July 29, 2011, with Rosewood Hotel Group stating in a press release that the company was looking to double the size of Rosewood's property portfolio within five years.

== Chief executives ==
1. Robert D. Zimmer (1979–1988)
2. Denny Alberts (1988–1998)
3. James F. Brown (1998–2003)
4. John M. Scott III (2003–2011)
5. Sonia C.M. Cheng (from 2011)

== Properties ==
This is a list of current Rosewood properties:

Americas

Americas
No.	Name	Location	Country	Opening Year
1	Kona Village, a Rosewood Resort	Kailua-Kona	United States	2023
2	Las Ventanas Al Paraíso, a Rosewood Resort	Los Cabos	Mexico	1997
3	Rosewood Baha Mar	Nassau	The Bahamas	2018
4	Rosewood Barbuda	Barbuda	Antigua and Barbuda	2028
5	Rosewood Bermuda	Bermuda	Bermuda	2009
6	Rosewood Exuma	Exuma	Bahamas	2028
7	Rosewood Hotel Georgia	Vancouver	Canada	2011
8	Rosewood Inn of the Anasazi	Santa Fe	United States	1991
9	Rosewood Le Guanahani St. Barth	Saint Barthélemy	France	2021
10	Rosewood Little Dix Bay	British Virgin Islands	United Kingdom	1993
11	Rosewood Mandarina	Nayarit	Mexico	2025
12	Rosewood Mansion on Turtle Creek	Dallas	United States	1981
13	Rosewood Mayakoba	Riviera Maya	Mexico	2007
14	Rosewood Mexico City	Mexico City	Mexico	2026
15	Rosewood Miramar Beach	Montecito	United States	2019
16	Rosewood San Miguel de Allende	San Miguel de Allende	Mexico	2011
17	Rosewood Sand Hill	Menlo Park	United States	2009
18	Rosewood São Paulo	São Paulo	Brazil	2022
19	Rosewood The Raleigh Miami Beach	Miami	United States	2025
20	Rosewood Washington, D.C.	Washington, D.C.	United States	2016
21	The Carlyle, a Rosewood Hotel	New York City	United States	2001

Europe

Europe
No.	Name	Location	Country	Opening Year
1	Rosewood Blue Palace	Crete	Greece	2027
2	Hôtel de Crillon, a Rosewood Hotel	Paris	France	2017
3	Rosewood Amsterdam	Amsterdam	The Netherlands	2025
4	Rosewood Castiglion del Bosco	Castiglion del Bosco	Italy	2015
5	Rosewood London	London	United Kingdom	2013
6	The Chancery Rosewood	London	United Kingdom	2025
7	Rosewood Milan	Milan	Italy	2026
8	Rosewood Munich	Munich	Germany	2023
9	Rosewood Rome	Rome	Italy	2026
10	Rosewood Schloss Fuschl	Salzburg	Austria	2024
11	Rosewood Vienna	Vienna	Austria	2022
12	Rosewood Villa Magna	Madrid	Spain	2021

Middle East

Middle East
No.	Name	Location	Country	Opening Year
1	Rosewood Abu Dhabi	Abu Dhabi	United Arab Emirates	2013
2	Rosewood Amaala	Amaala	Saudi Arabia	future opening
3	Rosewood Diriyah	Diriyah	Saudi Arabia	2027
4	Rosewood Doha	Doha	Qatar	2025
5	Rosewood Jeddah	Jeddah	Saudi Arabia	2007
6	Rosewood Red Sea	Shura Island	Saudi Arabia	future opening

Asia and Pacific

Asia and Pacific
No.	Name	Location	Country	Opening Year
1	Rosewood Bangkok	Bangkok	Thailand	2019
2	Rosewood Beijing	Beijing	China	2014
3	Rosewood Cape Kidnappers	Cape Kidnappers	New Zealand	2023
4	Rosewood Guangzhou	Guangzhou	China	2019
5	Rosewood Hangzhou	Hangzhou	China	future opening
6	Rosewood Hoi An	Hoi An	Vietnam	future opening
7	Rosewood Hong Kong	Hong Kong	China	2019
8	Rosewood Kauri Cliffs	Matauri Bay	New Zealand	2023
9	Rosewood Luang Prabang	Luang Prabang	Laos	2018
10	Rosewood Matakauri	Closeburn	New Zealand	2023
11	Rosewood Miyakojima	Miyako Island	Japan	2025
12	Rosewood Ningbo	Ningbo	China	future opening
13	Rosewood Phnom Penh	Phnom Penh	Cambodia	2018
14	Rosewood Phuket	Phuket	Thailand	2017
15	Rosewood Ranfaru	Malé	Maldives	2027
16	Rosewood Sanya	Sanya	China	2017
17	Rosewood Seoul	Seoul	South Korea	2027
18	Rosewood Shanghai	Shanghai	China	2028
19	Rosewood Shenzhen	Shenzhen	China	2026
20	Rosewood Tokyo	Tokyo	Japan	future opening
