= New World China Land =

New World China Land Limited
- Trade name: New World China
- Company type: subsidiary (formerly listed)
- Traded as: SEHK: 917 (former)
- Industry: Real estate
- Predecessor: Division of New World Dev.
- Founded: 28 August 1996; 29 years ago
- Founder: New World Development
Headquarters
Grand Cayman, Cayman Islands	(de jure)
Hong Kong S.A.R., China	(de facto)
- Area served: Mainland China
- Key people: Henry Cheng (Chairman)
- Brands: NWCL
- Revenue: ▼HK$17 billion (2014–15)
- Net income: ▼HK$3 billion (2014–15)
- Total assets: ▲HK$134 billion (2014–15)
- Total equity: ▲HK$61 billion (2014–15)
- Owner: New World Dev.
- Parent: New World Dev.
- Subsidiaries: New World China Property; New World Development (China); etc.

Chinese name
- Traditional Chinese: 新世界中國地產有限公司
- Simplified Chinese: 新世界中国地产有限公司
- Jyutping: san1 sai3 gaai3 zung1 gwok3 dei6 caan2 jau5 haan6 gung1 si1
- Cantonese Yale: sān sai gaai jūng gwok deih cháan yáuh haahn gūng sī
- Hanyu Pinyin: Xīnshìjiè zhōngguó dìchǎn yǒuxiàn gōngsī
Transcriptions
Standard Mandarin
- Hanyu Pinyin: Xīnshìjiè zhōngguó dìchǎn yǒuxiàn gōngsī
Yue: Cantonese
- Yale Romanization: sān sai gaai jūng gwok deih cháan yáuh haahn gūng sī
- Jyutping: san1 sai3 gaai3 zung1 gwok3 dei6 caan2 jau5 haan6 gung1 si1
- Website: www.nwcl.com.hk
- Footnotes / references in consolidated financial statement; financial year ended on 30 June each year

New World China Land Limited is a wholly owned subsidiary of Hong Kong–based conglomerate New World Development, itself part of Chow Tai Fook group. New World China Land was spin off from New World Development in 1999 as a separate listed company. However, it was privatized again by New World Development in 2016. New World China Land is headquartered in 9/F, New World Tower 1, on 8 Queen's Road Central, Central, Hong Kong.

== History ==
New World China Limited is a company incorporated in the Cayman Islands as an exempted company, the legal name for the offshore company in that territory, on 28 August 1996. The company was registered in Hong Kong as a "registered non-Hong Kong company" on 17 May 1999. It became a listed company on 16 July 1999 as New World China Land Limited, which owned the China part of the real estate division of New World Development (NWD Group), a blue-chip listed company of Hong Kong. New World China Land owned some hotels that was independent from another sub-holding company, New World Hotels (Holdings), a former listed company of NWD Group.

In 2011, New World China Land, via New World Hotel Management (BVI) Limited, trading as New World Hospitality, acquired the hotel management company Rosewood Hotels & Resorts for US$229.5 million (approx. HK$1.79 billion). In 2013, New World Hospitality (New World Hotel Group) was renamed to Rosewood Hotel Group.

In July 2015, New World China Land sold its hotel management business, New World Hotel Management (BVI) Limited and subsidiaries, to parent company Chow Tai Fook Enterprises for HK$1.96 billion. According to the press release, it included Rosewood and two other brands New World and penta.

In December 2015, New World China Land sold three portfolios to fellow Chinese developer Evergrande Group, for RMB13.5 billion (HK$16.36 billion).

In 2016 New World China Land was privatized by New World Development.

On January 27, 2020, New World China Land Limited announced a donation of RMB10 million, becoming the first Hong Kong company to donate funds to fight the epidemic. On January 28, K11 Group, under Vice Chairman Cheng Kar-shun, announced the establishment of a special fund for Wuhan's epidemic prevention and control, totaling RMB 5 million. The fund will be used to purchase medical supplies for Wuhan Union Hospital and donate funds to Wuhan Tongji Hospital. Simultaneously, the foundation has urgently transported two batches of surgical masks totaling 200,000 to Wuhan.

== Legacy ==
After the privatization of New World China Land, its parent company New World Development continued to use the brand New World China in some project, such as New World China Land's Wuhan Chow Tai Fook Finance Centre. Also, New World Development (China) Limited is a live subsidiary of the New World Development Group, which sold two hotels in 2017.

== See also ==
- Leung Chin-man appointment controversy
