= Henry Cheng =

Hong Kong businessman

The Honourable Henry Cheng GBM GBS
- Born: 鄭家純; Cheng Kar-shun; December 11, 1946 (age 79); Shunde, Guangdong, China
- Education: Ivey Business School (HBA, MBA)
- Occupation: businessman
- Children: 6
- Parent(s): Cheng Yu-tung; Chow Tsui-ying
- Relatives: Cheng Ka-shing (brother); Amy Cheng (sister); Lai-ha (sister); Adrian Cheng (son); Sonia Cheng; Brian Cheng; Christopher Cheng; Cheng Chak-wang and Cheng Chak-yin.

Henry Cheng
- Traditional Chinese: 鄭家純
- Simplified Chinese: 郑家纯
Transcriptions
Standard Mandarin
- Hanyu Pinyin: Zhèng Jiāchún
Yue: Cantonese
- Jyutping: Zeng6 Gaa1seon4

Henry Cheng Kar-shun, GBM, GBS (Chinese: 鄭家純; born 11 December 1946) is a Hong Kong billionaire property developer.

Cheng is the elder son of Cheng Yu-tung, who founded Hong Kong-listed New World Development, of which Henry succeeded his father as chairman. Cheng is Chairman of NWS Holdings, New World China Land, and New World Department Store China. He is also a standing committee member of the Eleventh Chinese People’s Political Consultative Conference.

In the 2012 Chief Executive election in Hong Kong, Cheng initially supported Henry Tang but switched to support the eventual winner, Leung Chun-ying. Leung's second Secretary for Development, Paul Chan, became embroiled in a property and credibility scandal, similar to the first, Mak Chai-kwong. Cheng was the first public figure to offer support.

Cheng has six children (from oldest to youngest): Adrian, Sonia, Brian, Christopher, Chak-Wang and Chak-yin.

He was awarded the Grand Bauhinia Medal (GBM) by the Hong Kong SAR Government in 2017.

Order of precedence
Preceded by Vincent Lo; Recipients of the Gold Bauhinia Star	Hong Kong order of precedence Recipients of the Gold Bauhinia Star	Succeeded by Tai Tak-fung; Recipients of the Gold Bauhinia Star
