= New World Development =

Hong Kong-based property company

New World Development Company Limited 新世界發展有限公司

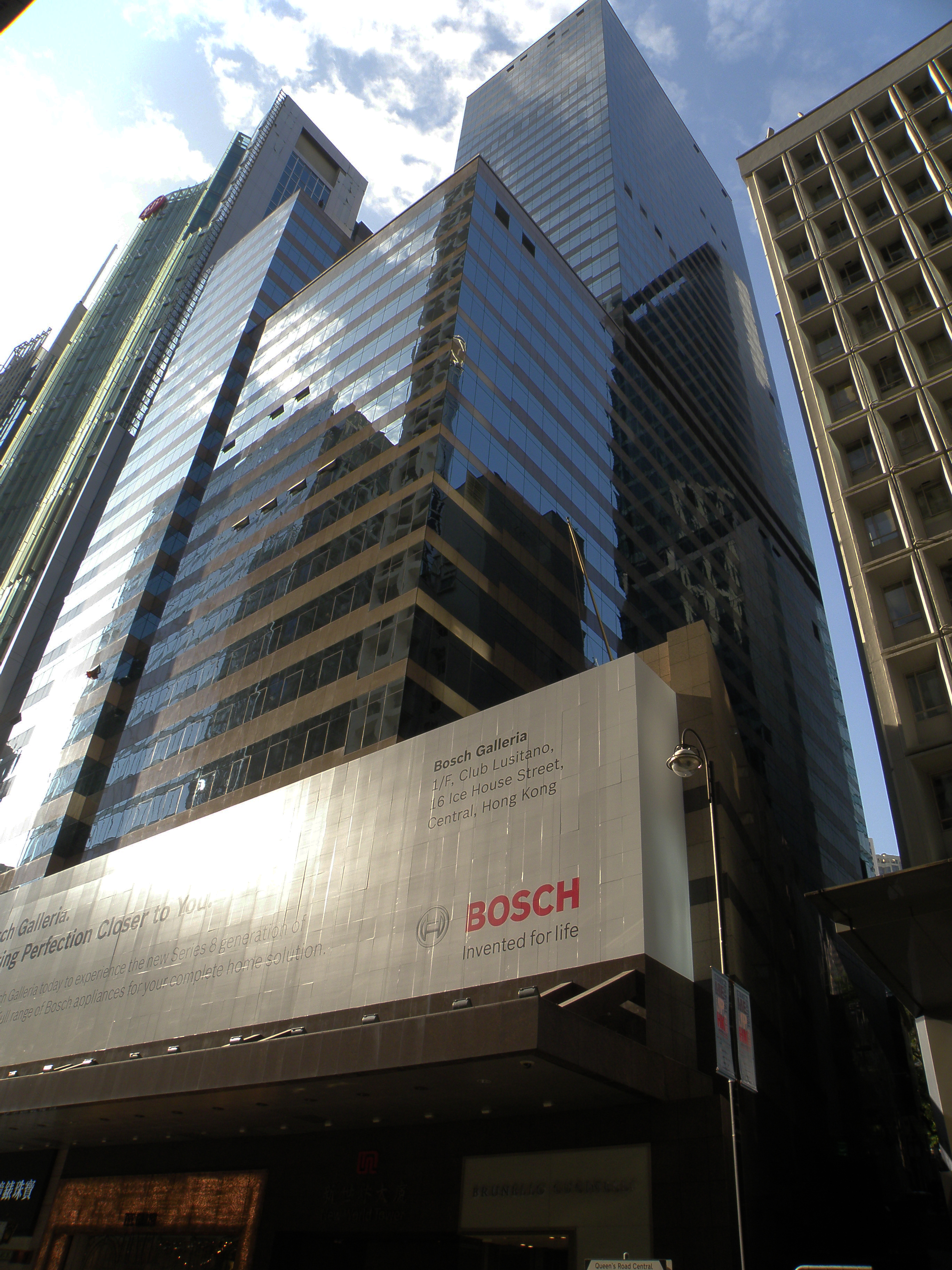
- Headquarters at New World Tower
- Type: Public Company
- Traded as: SEHK: 17
- Industry: conglomerate
- Founded: 29 May 1970
- Founder: Cheng Yu-tung
- Headquarters: New World Tower; Central, Hong Kong
- Key people: Henry Cheng (Chairman); Echo Huang（Chief Executive Officer）
- Products: Real property, Hotel, Infrastructure and Services, General merchandise
- Revenue: HK $59,6 billion (as of financial year 2016)
- Owner: Chow Tai Fook Enterprises Limited
- Number of employees: About 50,000 people (as of financial year 2014)
- Subsidiaries: NWS Holdings; New World Department Store China; New World China Land
- Website: www.nwd.com.hk

New World Development
- Traditional Chinese: 新世界發展有限公司
- Simplified Chinese: 新世界发展有限公司
Transcriptions
Standard Mandarin
- Hanyu Pinyin: Xīn Shìjiè Fāzhǎn Yǒuxiàngōngsī
Yue: Cantonese
- Jyutping: san1 sai3 gaai3 faat3 zin2 jau5 haan6 gung1 si1

New World Development Company Limited (NWD) is a Hong Kong–based company focused on property, hotels, infrastructure and services and department stores. It was established on 29 May 1970 by Cheng Yu-tung. The company is publicly listed on the Stock Exchange of Hong Kong Limited (SEHK: 17) since 23 November 1972 and was formerly a constituent stock of Hong Kong Hang Seng Index.

Over the last four decades, the group has also actively participated in various businesses in Mainland China and established itself as one of the largest foreign direct investors in the country. The group's existing investments in Mainland China has exceeded US$16.5 billion, spreading across four municipalities and over 19 provinces.

== History ==
New World Development was founded on May 29, 1970, with Dr. Ho Sin Hang as chairman and Cheng Yu-tung as Director and General Manager. The group went public on the Stock Exchange of Hong Kong Limited (SEHK) (SEHK: 17) in 1972.

=== Group reorganization ===
To bring together infrastructure projects in Hong Kong and Mainland China, New World Infrastructure Limited (NWI) was created and listed on SEHK (SEHK: 301) in October 1995. New World Services Limited (NWS) was then formed in April 1997 to integrate the group's service-related businesses. By July 1999, New World China Land Limited (NWCL) was launched to consolidate the group's property projects in Mainland China and was listed on SEHK (SEHK: 917).

In September 2001, NWS purchased all outstanding shares of Ngo Kee Construction Company Limited. A year later, Pacific Ports Company Limited (PPC) acquired NWI and took ownership of NWS from NWD.

Reorganization of New World Group was finalized in January 2003. Following a name change from Pacific Ports Company Limited, NWS Holdings Limited emerged as the group's service flagship, overseeing operations in services, infrastructure, and ports across Hong Kong, Macau, and Mainland China. All group shares were consolidated under NWS Holdings Limited, which then commenced trading on SEHK.

=== Recent developments ===
New World Department Store China Limited (SEHK: 0825) went public on SEHK in July 2007. The Guangzhou Dongxin Expressway—in which NWS Holdings owned a 40.8% ownership stake—officially inaugurated in December 2010.

In April 2015, NWD formed a 50-50 joint venture with HIP Company Limited, a subsidiary of The Abu Dhabi Investment Authority, to acquire the Grand Hyatt Hong Kong, Renaissance Harbour View, and Hyatt Regency TST with a deal valued at HK$18.5 billion, resulted in NWD receiving approximately HK$10 billion. NWD then launched its new healthcare brand, Humansa, and acquired FTLife in November and December 2018, respectively.

In October 2020, the group revealed plans to conserve Hong Kong's 68-year-old State Theatre, a Grade I historic site, partnering with local and international designers and artisans. In that month, the group began selling THE PAVILIA FARM I, attracting 22,700 registrations in the first round, the highest for any residential property in Hong Kong since 1997. The group also committed over HKD 10 billion to create a large-scale cultural and retail complex in Prince Bay, Shenzhen.

In November 2020, NWD named its mixed-use development project within the SKYCITY complex at the Hong Kong International Airport "11 SKIES". NWD established Share for Good, Hong Kong's first large-scale crowd-donation platform in March 2022, to meet the immediate needs of the impoverished in the fifth wave of COVID-19. In collaboration with Rafa Nadal Academy, Hong Kong Golf & Tennis Academy welcomed Asia's first Rafa Nadal Tennis Center in July 2022.

NWD collaborated with 4 corporations in July 2023 to establish the first "Smart Community" in a transitional housing complex. NWD signed Hong Kong's first "Project Cooperation Agreement regarding Northern Metropolis" in December 2023, to develop a commercial and residential project in the Northern Metropolis with CR Land.

In 2024, NWD reported a HK$19.7 billion net loss for the year ended 30 June, the worst since the company was founded in 1970. Adrian Cheng Chi-Kong, the grandson of Cheng Yu-tung, was forced to step down as CEO in September. In December, NWD was kicked out of the Hang Seng Index (HSI). In the same month of being kicked out of HSI, Debtwire reported that NWD have sent out a letter to its bank lenders, seeking a waiver on loan conditions. NWD was seeking forbearance, after its net debt to assets ratio breached the 100 per cent threshold that may allow its lenders to recall their loans.

In June 2024, NWD was among ten companies to receive the (Building and Construction Information) BCI Asia Top 10 Developers Award.

On 15 November 2026, NWD proposed a HK$24.9 billion rights issue to reduce its debt level.

== Organization ==
The head office is in the New World Tower in Central, Hong Kong.

New World Development owned listed companies NWS Holdings and still owns New World Department Store China. New World China Land Limited is wholly owned by New World Development. The company also owned former listed company New World Hotels (Holdings). Rosewood Hotel Group, an hotel management company, is a former subsidiary of NWD group.

New World Development and sister listed company Chow Tai Fook Jewellery Group are both majority owned by privately owned Chow Tai Fook (Holding).

New World Development Company Limited is one of the Hong Kong companies who have a large landbank. As at 31 December 2014, the group had a landbank of around 9.25 million sq ft, of which around 5.3 million sq ft was residential property. The group had a total of approximately 18.3 million sq ft of attributable agricultural land reserve pending for conversion.

== Cultural values ==
The group's brand personality is defined by “The Artisanal Movement”, which is described as a journey that expands imagination beyond mere aesthetics, focusing on the creation of a modern living culture rooted in originality and bespoke craftsmanship. It encourages its staff to think creatively and develop unique ideas that enhance customer experiences.

The five core elements are:

- Imagination
- Bespoke
- Craftsmanship
- Heritage
- Contemporary

These elements collectively aim to foster a culture that values human creativity, sustainability, and social responsibility.

== Core business ==
=== Properties ===
==== Major properties for sale in Hong Kong ====
- The Pavilia Farm
- Mount Pavilia
- The Pavilia Forest
- Atrium House
- Double Cove Starview
- The Pavilia Bay
- The Reach

==== Major properties for lease in Hong Kong ====
- 83 King Lam Street
- ARTISAN HUB
- Methodist House
- PARK SIGNATURE
- 11 SKIES
- K11 Art Mall
- Hong Kong Convention and Exhibition Centre, Shopping Arcade
- 888 Lai Chi Kok Road
- New World Tower
- Manning House
- Mount Pavilia
- K11 MUSEA
- ATL Logistics Centre
- KOHO
- Artisan Lab
- Pearl City
- TIMBER HOUSE
- Kai Tak Sports Park
- THE FOREST
- K11 ATELIER Victoria Dockside
- K11 ATELIER King's Road

=== Other businesses ===
==== Hotels and residences ====
- K11 ARTUS
- Rosewood Hong Kong
- Grand Hyatt Hong Kong
- Hyatt Regency Hong Kong, Tsim Sha Tsui
- Renaissance Harbour View Hotel
- Hyatt Regency Hong Kong, Sha Tin

==== Healthcare services ====
- Humansa

==== Education ====
- Hong Kong Golf & Tennis Academy (HKGTA)

== Senior leadership ==
- Chairman: Henry Cheng (since March 2012)
- Chief Executive: Echo Huang (since November 2024)

=== Former chairmen ===
1. Ho Sin-hang (1970–1982)
2. Cheng Yu-tung (1982–2012)

=== Former chief executives ===
This position was formerly known as Managing Director (until 2012) and General Manager (until 2020)

1. Cheng Yu-tung (1970–1989)
2. Henry Cheng (1989–2012)
3. Adrian Cheng and Chen Guanzhan (2012–2017); co-general managers
4. Adrian Cheng (2017–2024)
5. Eric Ma (2024)

== Membership and loyalty program ==
=== New World CLUB ===
The New World CLUB is a loyalty program operated by the New World Group that offers members benefit such as exclusive discounts and events. There are currently 3 membership tiers.

Membership Tiers:
Tiers	CIRCLE	VIVA	DIAMOND
Threshold	18 years old or above	Current owners or tenants of New World Residential Properties	Current owners of New World Residential Properties with total purchase price of HK$20 million or more; or Current tenants of New World Residential Properties with monthly rental of HK$60,000.
Membership Tiers Exclusive Offers
Discount on Selected Property Units	Yes	Yes	Yes
Previews for Selected Properties		Yes	Yes
Shopping Offers	Yes	Yes	Yes
Hotel Dining Offers		Yes	Yes
Birthday Privilege		Yes	Yes
24x7 Personalized Concierge Service			Yes
Exclusive Events and Workshops	Yes	Yes	Yes
Parking Offers		Yes	Yes
New World CLUB eNews Subscription	Yes	Yes	Yes

=== K Dollar Program ===
The K Dollar Program is a loyalty initiative developed in collaboration between New World Development, K11, and Chow Tai Fook. By becoming a KLUB 11 member and linking to the K Dollar Program account, members can earn K Dollars, which can be used as instant cash at a wide range of participating merchants. A minimum spending amount of 10 K Dollars is required for redemption. The K Dollar conversion rate varies by KLUB 11 tier:

Tier	General Member	Gold Card Member	Black Card Member
K Dollar Conversion Rate	Cumulative spending HK$250 = Up to 1 K Dollars	Cumulative spending HK$250 = Up to 1.5 K Dollars	Cumulative spending HK$250 = Up to 2 K Dollars

The program features over 1,000 merchants throughout Hong Kong, including locations within K11 Art Mall and Victoria Dockside.

In March 2024, a feature was introduced allowing members to link their Visa cards to the K11 HK app, enabling automatic earning of K Dollars without the need to queue up at the concierge, upload receipts, or scan the QR codes. This integration is part of a multi-year partnership between New World Development (NWD) and Visa to deepen customer engagement and stimulate local spend. Upon linking their Visa cards to the K11 HK app, customers who spend with Visa can earn K Dollars automatically.

== Controversies ==
=== Hung Hom Peninsula ===
The Hung Hom Peninsula was sold for a below-market land premium of HK$864 million to New World Development, who subsequently sold off half share to Sun Hung Kai Properties. In 2004, the consortium announced the demolition of these buildings to make way for luxury apartments, to be faced with huge popular outcry about the needless destruction of "perfectly good buildings" to satisfy "corporate greed". In an unprecedented about-turn, the developers withdrew the plan on 10 December 2004.

=== Leung Chin-man ===
In 2008, New World was the subject of controversy when it announced it had hired former Permanent Secretary for Housing, Planning and Lands Leung Chin-man as deputy managing director and executive director of its China subsidiary, New World China Land Ltd. The Secretary for the Civil Service Denise Yue Chung-yee, signed off on the approval for him to take up the job within three years of leaving, failing to take into account the appearance of conflict of interest resulting from the Hung Hom Peninsula affair. New World argued that they hired Leung in good faith, after the government had given clearance. New World announced in the early hours of 16 August that the parties had agreed to rescind the contract.

=== Avenue of Stars ===
The company has managed the Avenue of Stars for 11 years, and its contract is due to expire. It was announced that the Leisure and Cultural Services Department of the Hong Kong government would redevelop and expand the avenue jointly with the company. The Hong Kong government declared that the enhancement project would contain limited commercial appeal, and no luxury shops or high-end restaurants would be added. The walkway, very popular with tourists, was closed off for three years while the expansion was undertaken.

The decision to award the contract for the redevelopment to the company without putting it out to tender, on the justification that the project was non-profit, sparked controversy locally. Residents' groups and other development companies owning properties adjacent to the walk expressed discontent, whilst the LCSD claimed that consultations with the local district council had been favourable. In an apparent attempt to de-fuse the public furore at the apparent collusion between government and big business, the government promised a public consultation.

=== Chubby Hearts ===
HK$7.8 million was granted by the Hong Kong Mega Arts and Cultural Events Committee to host in February 2024 Chubby Hearts by British designer Anya Hindmarch, who has a shop in K11 Musea, a mall founded by New World Development.

== See also ==
- New World Centre
- New World First Bus
- New World First Ferry
- Citybus (Hong Kong)
- New World Telecommunications
- K11 (Hong Kong)
- List of companies in Hong Kong
