= K11 =

K-11 or K11 may refer to:

- K-11 (film), a 2012 American prison drama
- K-11 (Kansas highway)
- K-11 (1927), a state highway in Kansas now numbered K-99
- K11 (Shanghai), an office building and shopping mall in Shanghai
- K-11 (sniper rifle), an Armenian sniper rifle
- K11 – Kommissare im Einsatz, a German television series
- K11 Art Foundation, a non-profit art foundation based in Hong Kong
- K11 Art Mall, a shopping centre in Hong Kong
- HMS K11, a K-class submarine of the Royal Navy
- Kawanishi K-11, a Japanese carrier fighter aircraft
- LSWR K11 class, a British steam railcar
- Nissan Micra (K11), a Japanese hatchback
- S&T Daewoo K11, a South Korean assault rifle
- Sonata in G, K. 11, by Wolfgang Amadeus Mozart
- Soviet submarine K-11, a November-class submarine of the Soviet Navy

== See also ==
- K-11 (k-to-11), a variant of K–12 education ending at grade 11
