= Adrian Cheng =

Hong Kong businessman

Adrian Cheng 鄭志剛
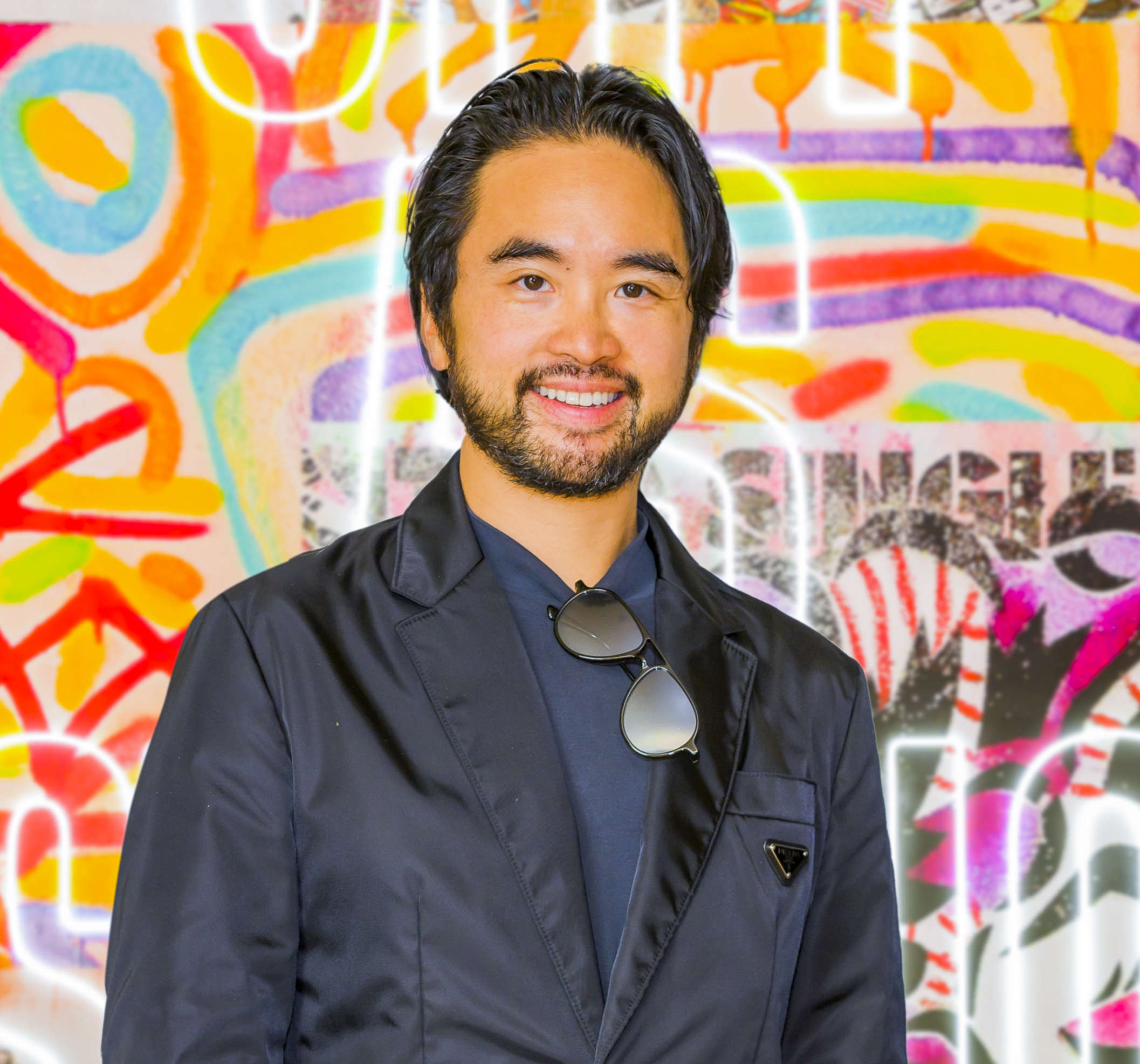
- Born: November 2, 1979 (age 47); Hong Kong
- Education: Harvard University
- Occupation: Businessman
- Years active: 2000s-present
- Known for: Cheng family heir Founder of K11
- Title: Former CEO & vice-chairman of New World Development
- Term: 2015–2024
- Spouse: Jennifer Yu
- Children: 3
- Father: Henry Cheng
- Relatives: Cheng Yu-tung (grandfather)

Chinese name
- Traditional Chinese: 鄭志剛
- Simplified Chinese: 郑志刚
Transcriptions
Standard Mandarin
- Hanyu Pinyin: Zhèng Zhìgāng
Yue: Cantonese
- Jyutping: zeng6 zi3 gong1

Adrian Cheng Chi-kong (Chinese: 鄭志剛, born November 2, 1979) is a Hong Kong billionaire businessman son of property developer Henry Cheng and grandson of Cheng Yu-tung. He is the former CEO and executive vice-chairman of the family company, New World Development, the heir and executive director of jewelry company Chow Tai Fook. He is the founder of K11, which has a portfolio of commercial, cultural and residential projects.

In June 2025 he resigned from all his executive roles at New World Development after the company posted a US$2.5 billion loss.

== Early life ==
Cheng was born to Katherine Ip and Henry Cheng in 1979. He has three younger siblings: Sonia, Brian, and Christopher Cheng.

Cheng attended Taft School in Connecticut and earned a Bachelor of Arts in East Asian Studies from Harvard University.

== Honorary degrees ==
He received an honorary doctorate from the Savannah College of Art and Design (SCAD) and honorary fellowships from Lingnan University, The University of Hong Kong and Hong Kong University of Science and Technology (HKUST). He is a member of the dean’s council at Harvard Kennedy School.

== Career ==
Early in his career, Cheng was a banker at Goldman Sachs and UBS. In 2002, Cheng left UBS AG to join his family's business Chow Tai Fook Holdings as executive director of the listed Chow Tai Fook Jewelry Group.

In March 2007, Cheng joined New World Development, his family company, as executive director and a board member, becoming joint general manager in 2012, and executive vice-chairman of New World Development in 2015. He was recognised by the World Economic Forum in the same year as a Young Global Leader.

In 2008, Cheng founded K11. It merges art and commerce, a concept which has been referred to as "cultural commerce." Cheng's first K11 cultural-retail mall opened in Tsim Sha Tsui, Hong Kong in 2009. It later opened a branch in Shanghai. Since then, other branches have been opened in Guangzhou, Hong Kong, Shanghai, Shenyang, and Wuhan. He founded the K11 Art Foundation (KAF) in 2010, which focuses on promoting and supporting Chinese artists and their works. He initiated collaborations between internationally recognised museums and art institutions such as Palais de Tokyo in Paris, and Institute of Contemporary Arts (ICA) in London, showcasing Chinese artists. The foundation also has an art village in Wuhan. In 2012, Cheng featured in Fortune magazine's 40 Under 40 list. In 2013, he launched K11 Artmall. His work with K11 led him to be included in the ArtReview Power100 list several times since 2014, most recently in 2021.

In 2017, Cheng led the Victoria Dockside redevelopment of land held by New World since the 1970s, at a cost of $2.6 billion. As different phases of the development completed, new K11 ventures opened. This included K11 ARTUS, a luxury waterside residence that opened in the second half of 2019; the flagship K11 ATELIER, a Grade A office building; and Rosewood Hong Kong, a luxury hotel of New World. New World bought U.S.-based Rosewood in 2011.

Cheng launched C Ventures (rebranded as C Capital in September 2022), an investment fund investing in fashion, media and lifestyle start-ups. In July 2025, the company will be listed on the Swiss Stock Exchange through a merger with Swiss-listed investment firm Youngtimers AG and the entity will be renamed C Capital AG upon approval and completion of the transaction. In 2018, Cheng founded the K11 Craft and Guild Foundation, a non-profit organisation to identify fast-disappearing crafts and offer public initiatives.

In June 2019, he was named the "first global ambassador" of the Council of Fashion Designers of America (CFDA). In September 2019, Cheng presided over the announcement that New World would donate 3 million square feet of agricultural land to the government for public housing and related facilities, NGOs and to charities to develop social or transitional housing. Up to a third of the land was to be donated to an affordable social housing project.

In 2019, Cheng was rewarded by the French government with Ordre des Arts et des Lettres. It was following K11's collaboration with Cannes Film Festival, which hosted its first ever film week in Hong Kong the same year. In October 2019, he became executive director of NWS Holdings, New World Development's infrastructure arm. On 13 February 2020, Cheng was named the executive chair of the New World subsidiary New World China Land, while keeping his role as executive vice-chairman of New World Development. As of 2020, he runs two private Hong Kong investment ventures: C Ventures and K11 Investment. Leaving his position as general manager, he was promoted to CEO of New World Development in May 2020. In October 2020, Cheng oversaw NWD's acquisition of the State Theatre Building in Hong Kong for redevelopment. A team of conversation consultants were set up to preserve the 68-year old building, which is a Grade 1 historical building. Towards the end of the same year, Cheng first mentioned his and New World Developments vision for improving environmental, social, and corporate governance in Hong Kong. Creating Shared Value, abbreviated to CSV, was Cheng's proposal which he defined as "a connection between social progress and business success." The first project he believed this could be delivered on was the State Theatre site.

In January 2021, CTF Education was launched with plans to invest HK$3 billion in upcoming education projects in Hong Kong and Greater China. Cheng would serve as its Vice Chairman and Chief Executive, with the first school of many expected to open in late 2023. A partnership was also announced with Benenden School as part of the educational project. As part of the initiative, CTF also launched EDUMAKERS. In November 2021, Cheng announced that he would build virtual land in The Sandbox’s metaverse.

Cheng announced in 2021 that he was to partner with Hong Kong-based biotech startup, Prenetics. Cheng later acquired the startup, with the aim of making healthcare more accessible in Hong Kong. Other investments in 2021 included tech accessory startup, Casetify.

11 SKIES was announced as another concept developed by Cheng, which is to be located near Hong Kong International Airport. The announcement came in May 2022, and focuses on providing retail, dining and entertainment without the need to travel into the city. In June 2022, Cheng spoke about the expansion of subsidiary Humansa's health and wellness facilities in the Greater Bay Area. This followed a number of partnerships and acquisitions by the healthcare firm. In July 2022, it was announced K11 would be launching K11 ECOAST, the first of its kind in mainland China. The $1.4 billion development is to be constructed in Shenzhen on its waterfront. During the same month, Cheng's Prenetics was listed on the NASDAQ. It became the first Hong Kong-based unicorn to be listed in the United States.

In July 2022, Cheng was part of the Hong Kong honours list, when he received the Silver Bauhinia Star. The recognition came following his efforts to improve the city of Hong Kong. In October 2022, Cheng was a recipient of the Ordre national du Mérite from the French government. During the presentation of the award, Consul General of France Christile Drulhe, stated Cheng "has been working tirelessly to foster stronger relations between France and Hong Kong." During the same month, he also received an Honorary University Fellowship in The University of Hong Kong. In February 2023, it was announced that Cheng had been appointed as non-executive director and a co-chairman of Meta Media Holdings. As the largest fashion and luxury media organization in China, it was suggested by Forbes that Cheng could assist with the growth of the business internationally. Meta Media's share price rose by 201% on the day Cheng's appointment was announced. In June 2023, Cheng was one of the backers of NaaS Technology during its SPO. In July 2024, Cheng received the "Best CEO" award in Institutional Investor's Annual Rankings for the fourth consecutive year. Ironically, just a few months later he was forced out of his CEO role after New World Development was poised to report a loss close to 20 billion Hong Kong Dollars for the financial year, the worst since the founding and of the company half a century before.

On September 2025, Cheng launched ALMAD Group, a Hong Kong-based conglomerate targeting digital assets and transformative industries including culture, entertainment, sports, media, healthcare, commercial management, and cultural tourism. The firm focuses on emerging markets such as mainland China, ASEAN countries, and the Middle East, with a mission to break boundaries, build what the next generation needs, and shape a future economy filled with possibilities. As founder and executive chairman, Cheng plans to globalize the "K11 by AC" cultural brand, including expanding its Anime IP business in mainland China and the Middle East. Cheng has previously provided early-stage funding to startups such as the Chinese social media platform Xiaohongshu, electric vehicle maker XPeng Motors, Hong Kong-based microfinance platform Micro Connect, and others including fast-fashion giant Shein.

Cheng spearheaded a series of international philanthropic and commercial initiatives following the launch of ALMAD Group. In late 2025, he led the WEMP Foundation in partnering with the Rafa Nadal Foundation to promote youth well-being through sports and play, with a focus on nurturing life skills, resilience, and social inclusion among young people in Hong Kong and the region. During the same period, Cheng expanded his business footprint in the Middle East by signing a strategic retail partnership in Dubai with the Wafi Group, a conglomerate headed by a member of Dubai's royal family, to introduce Chinese cultural and entertainment brands into the region, marking a significant step in cross-border cultural and retail collaboration.

== Philanthropy ==
His philanthropic work led him to be featured in the 2017 edition of Asia's Heroes Of Philanthropy, published by Forbes magazine.

During the COVID-19 pandemic, Cheng launched Lovewithoutborders. The movement aimed to provide international assistance to those that required help. The project subsequently donated over 1.5 million masks to Europe in early 2020. Donations were also made to low-income families in Hong Kong and a large shipment of over 1 million masks went to mainland China. In June 2021, Cheng attended a naming ceremony at the Hong Kong University of Science and Technology (HKUST), after the University announced its Robotics Institute would be named after his father. This followed the Chow Tai Fook Charity Foundation donating HK$100 million to the University for investment and research purposes. In September 2021, Cheng announced the establishment of a new non-profit organisation, New World Build for Good. It aims to alleviate the housing shortage in Hong Kong.

In 2022, Cheng led an initiative to help underprivileged Hongkongers. The crowd-donation platform, Share for Good, allows for donations of goods and supplies from donors. Shortly after its launch, donations of essential supplies were made by the private sector on the platform, to assist those affected by coronavirus epidemic.

In November 2022, Cheng launched the WEMP Foundation. The non-profit foundation was formed in February 2021 to promote mental well-being for children and their families, following a 40% increase in the number of psychiatric patients aged below 18 over the COVID-19 pandemic period. The South China Morning Post reported WEMP Foundation would provide counselling for carers and/or parents, with Mindful Support (therapeutic support and financial aid) also available for severe cases. In April 2023, Cheng and The WEMP Foundation announced the launch of Action Team to deepen local district effort. Together with the foundation's three major programs of 18 District Positive Parenting School Tour, Children’s Emotion-Management Workshop, and Early Childhood Parenting Program in kindergarten, it aims to help society by improving children's mental health. As of March 2024, WEMP Foundation has served more than 60,000 children and parents. In the same month WEMP held a charity gala called The Children Ball in Hong Kong, with the main aim to raise vital funds in support of children with special needs. The event was held in partnership with the Naked Heart France, which was founded by Natalia Vodianova Arnault.

== Boards and committees ==
He is on the boards of companies such as New World Development and Chow Tai Fook Enterprises, among others. On 13 January 2023, Cheng was appointed as a new member of the Board of Directors of the Financial Services Development Council (FSDC).

Cheng holds a number of art-focused board positions including, WKCDA Board Member of M+ from October 2016 to October 2018, a member of M+ Founding Benefactors, the major donors of M+, Visiting Committee of The Metropolitan Museum of Art, Board Member of Asia Art Archive, Trustee of Royal Academy of Arts, Board Member of The Friends of Guimet Museum, and Member of International Circle of Centre Pompidou.

On 17 January 2023, Hong Kong Government appointed Cheng as the chairman of a new arts and culture committee, Mega Arts and Cultural Events Committee, "seeking to bring big events back to the city". Later on 21 February 2023, Hong Kong Government appointed Cheng as one of the members of the Culture Commission for a period of two years from 1 March 2023. In November 2023, The Financial Services Development Council announced the establishment of the Hong Kong Academy for Wealth Legacy, with Cheng appointed as the Chairman of the Board of Directors with effect from 14 November 2023. The Academy is dedicated to foster Hong Kong as a leading global family office hub.

“Contenu polémique, non neutre, basé sur des sources primaires — suppression conformément aux règles de neutralité.”

== Personal life ==
Cheng is married to Jennifer Yu and they have three children. He is recognized as a collector of contemporary art. Cheng has three younger siblings: Sonia, Brian, and Christopher Cheng.
