= Avrom Lasarow =

South African businessperson (born 1976)

Avi Lasarow
- Avi Lasarow at the 2015 South African Chamber of Commerce Awards
- Born: Avrom Boris Lasarow; 2 January 1976 (age 50); Johannesburg, South Africa
- Occupations: Businessman, writer, philanthropist
- Spouse: Kelly Lasarow (m. 2016)

Avrom Boris Lasarow (born 2 January 1976) is a South African-British businessman in the field of genetics. Much of his work has been centred around DNA testing and the development of hair alcohol testing. Lasarow is based in the United Kingdom and also acts as an honorary consul between South Africa and the UK.

In 2013 Lasarow founded DNAFit, a company that sells DNA testing kits developed for nutritional and fitness purposes. In 2018, DNAFit was acquired by Hong Kong company Prenetics, with Lasarow being appointed its CEO.

Since 2020, Lasarow has been involved in the public debate surrounding health passports in the United Kingdom, which he advocated as a gateway to safer and speedier easing of lockdown restrictions during the COVID-19 pandemic. Under his leadership of European CEO of Prenetics, the company has expanded considerably, offering point-of-care testing within professional settings and leisure spaces, as well as providing COVID-19 testing bundles to the travel industry and their respective hubs, including Heathrow, Luton, Stansted and Southend airports.

== Early life and career ==
Lasarow was born in Johannesburg, South Africa in January 1976, and educated in the United States, where he gained a grade 12 general equivalency diploma at the age of 16. After briefly returning to South Africa, Lasarow relocated to the United Kingdom in 1998 where he began his career working for financial services multinational Citibank.

After leaving the finance sector, Lasarow founded a number of life sciences companies. In 2011, Lasarow released "Who is Really Who?", a guide on DNA paternity testing, and was actively developing a hair test that was able to detect up to three months of prior alcohol or drug abuse.

He established DNAFit in 2013, which would ultimately grow into a multinational company in 2018, as part of Prenetics.

In October 2019, Lasarow appeared as a witness before the UK Government's Science and Technology Select Committee, where he submitted evidence and spoke of the benefits of the direct commercial availability of genomic tests for consumers.

== Role in sports science innovation ==
Lasarow's DNAFit outfit has been a recognisable brand in the world of sports nutrition since the 2010s, bridging the gap between genetic composition of athletes and their fitness goals. Lasarow received high levels of media attention after the brand became utilised by top tier athletes seeking to naturally improve performance. He promoted DNAFit as a tool which could tap into genetic profiles in a way that the information collected could be used to customise workout routines or dietary planning.

In the lead up to the 2014 FIFA World Cup, DNAFit showcased the genetic profiles of a number of international players including Bryan Ruiz (Costa Rica), Glen Johnson (England), Giorgos Karagounis (Greece) and Ashkan Dejagah (Iran). Lasarow revealed that in addition to nutritional planning, the results could also be used to premeditate potential injury risks for the players, and estimate recovery times in each case. Earlier that year, British sprinter Jenny Meadows had used DNAFit, which revealed she was prone to tendon injuries. Prior to this, she had been unable to compete in the 2012 Summer Olympics due to such an injury. Meadows echoed Lasarow's belief that such technology should be used to premeditate injury and in turn tailor training accordingly to reduce risk.

In May 2020, former footballer Rio Ferdinand backed DNAFit, becoming an advisor and shareholder. Lasarow and Ferdinand are friends and neighbours, in Orpington, Kent. During the same period, The Daily Telegraph newspaper reported that a complaint had been brought against one of Lasarow's companies, Mole Detective, in 2015. The app was launched to rate risks of melanoma developing from images of moles uploaded by their users. The U.S. Federal Trade Commission (FTC) alleged that the company had produced a misleading advertisement, which suggested that the app could provide an assessment similar to a physical screening performed by a dermatologist. Lasarow chose not to appeal the civil action, citing no desire to fight a "long court proceeding", and settled out of court for a sum of $58,623.

== 2020 coronavirus outbreak ==
=== Health passports ===
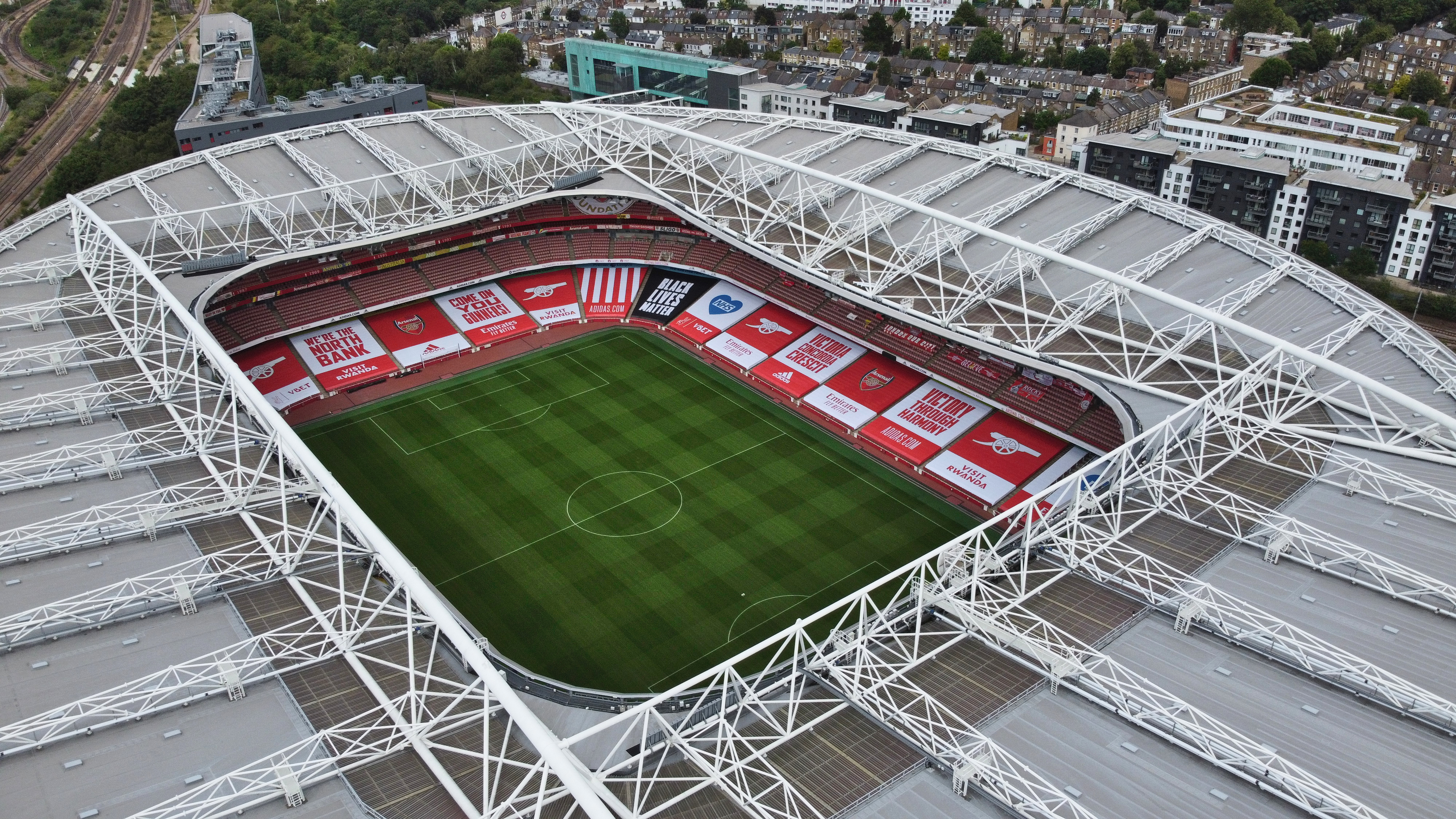
Competitive sport eventually resumed in 2020, with games initially being played without spectators.

During the COVID-19 pandemic in the United Kingdom, live sporting events with fan attendance ceased to take place as a result of lockdown restrictions. With the anticipated easing of restrictions in mid-2020, widespread debate entered public discourse, with some proposing the introduction of health passports as a means of containing the spread of the virus and encouraging faster economic recovery. During this period, Prenetics were tasked with delivering a faster testing system for all 20 football clubs of the Premier League, and had introduced a mandatory requirement of health passports for athletes, broadcasters and staff who were entering sporting venues. By October they had introduced mobile testing units to "turbocharge" the process. Lasarow publicly advocated extending testing at "the point of care" for fans in order to produce quicker turn-around times and relieve strain on laboratories. He also called on the UK government, as part of Operation Moonshot, to integrate NHS Test and Trace with a digital health passport system and to utilise the services of other commercial companies for wider coverage.

In September 2020, Lasarow appeared before the UK government's Digital, Culture, Media and Sport Committee to provide evidence for a digital health passport system. He cited the adoption of such measures by the airline industry, notably Cathay Pacific, to meet the demands of countries requiring a negative COVID test result for admittance of arrivals from abroad. The select committee also looked at the example of theatres, and included the participation of Andrew Lloyd Webber, who suggested a trial be put in place. Lasarow also cited DNAFit's implementation of similar systems in both the social care sector and film studios as examples of where health passports had been successful.

In October, Lasarow called on regular testing to be implemented in British airports, citing Germany and Jersey as examples of places which had already made this mandatory. Amid growing concern that counterfeit COVID-19 test certificates were being sold on the black market, Lasarow advocated international co-operation to produce a universal certificate with a standardised template. By mid-December, DNAFit was one of eleven companies which had been recognised by the UK government as an approved test provider as part of its Test to Release travel scheme.

Lasarow announced in November that Prenetics would provide health passports to stakeholders and fans of all Premier League football teams free of charge. In addition to the Premier League, the company also secured contracts to provide testing for the England cricket team, Moto GP, Formula One, the British Boxing Board of Control and the Royal International Horse Show. In May 2022, Prenetics became the official testing provider for the 2022 Commonwealth Games in Birmingham.

=== Testing pods ===
In March 2021, Lasarow announced a new initiative of COVID-19 point-of-care testing for workers to encourage people to return to their traditional workplaces, following the "work from home" directive enforced as part of the United Kingdom's lockdown restrictions. The scheme piloted ten testing pod sites, including at the IWG plc bases in Dartford, Kent and Reading, Berkshire, where both employees and visitors could undertake a PCR test to detect COVID-19 transmission. Positive results were directly sent to Public Health England. Lasarow later announced that further such testing sites would be rolled out in Bristol and Leeds. He encouraged the British government to adopt a nationwide version of the scheme from June, when the majority of the country's workforce would be expected to return to their places of work.

=== Travel testing ===
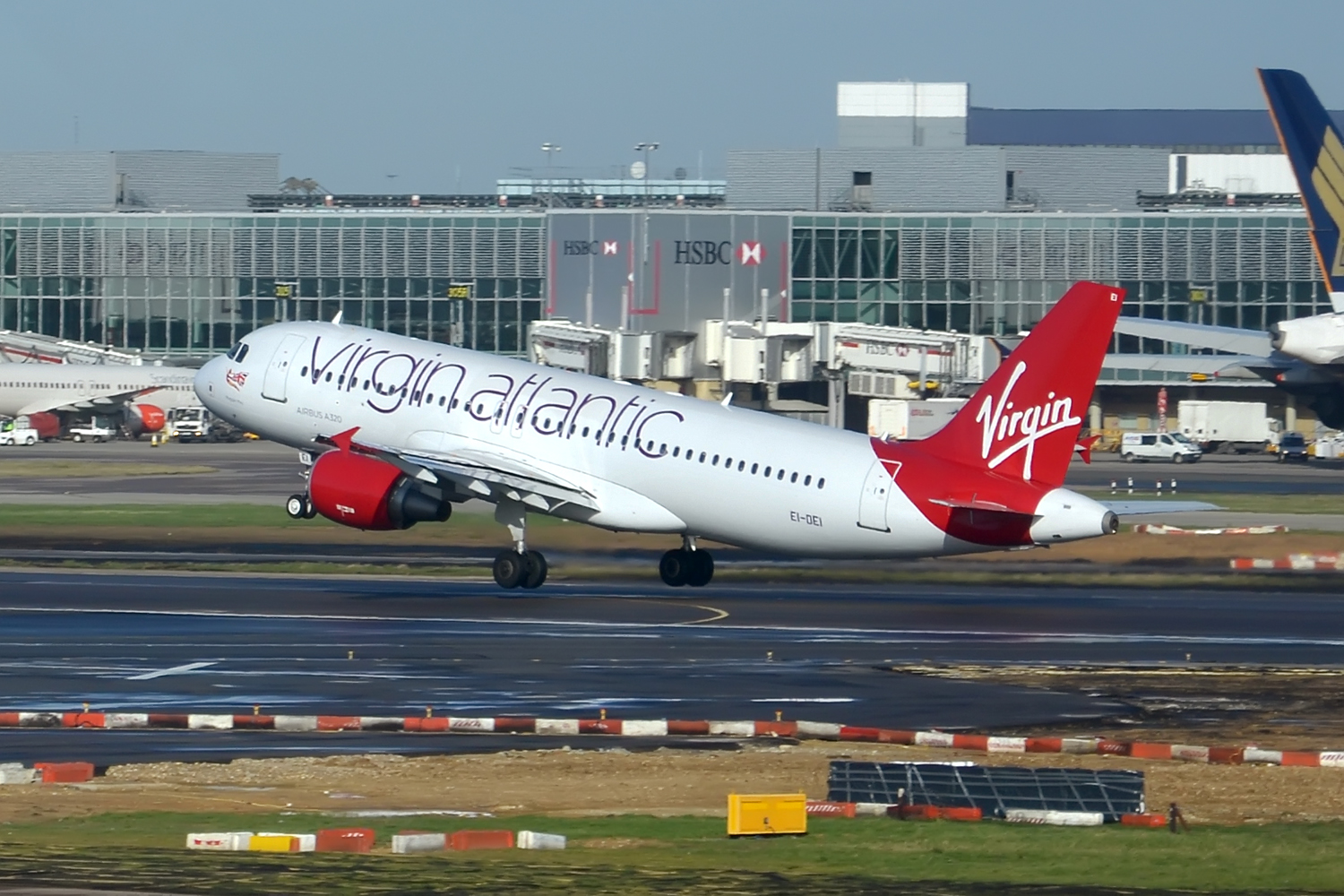
Virgin Atlantic were one of the first companies to partner with Prenetics to offer travel test bundles

In May 2021, Lasarow announced that Prenetics had partnered with Virgin Atlantic in an effort to ease travel amidst continued restrictions during the pandemic. The initiative, called Project Screen, provided passengers with a single bundle of PCR and rapid antigen tests at a more affordable rate, and allowed the package to be tailored to specific journeys, including round trips, depending on where the destination was classed on the UK's travel traffic light system. By 13 May, Lasarow had announced that Prenetics would expand their testing output following calls from Lord Bethell for the private sector to invest in capacity as demand in travel rose significantly following the easing of restrictions on foreign travel. The laboratories in Greenwich and Orpington boosted their PCR test output by an additional 450,000. Under Lasarow, the firm also saw a growth in employees from 12 in March 2020 to 400 by May 2021. On 25 May, Lasarow announced that the testing bundle had also been adopted by Eurotunnel Le Shuttle.

Amidst a significant surge in demand for international travel in June 2021, Lasarow called for the British government to scrap VAT on travel-related testing, stating that "it’s crucial the government removes VAT on holiday COVID tests which could save a family of four travelling to Spain around £250 and help them fly safer and cheaper." He also criticised the government for their list of approved testing companies, describing it as “the wild west with cowboys not playing fair with holidaymakers”. Whilst praising their focus on ensuring higher standards, Lasarow called for a review in pricing to avoid consumers being unfairly overcharged. He stated that, in some instances, "testing providers [had been] luring in consumers with misleading prices, and then offering tests up to nine times more expensive". By August, Health Secretary Sajid Javid had responded to accusations of excessive pricing and exploitative practices by asking the respective watchdog, the Competition and Markets Authority, to investigate. Lasarow responded, calling the decision to investigate "long overdue".

In September 2021, Lasarow announced that Prenetics had partnered with Unipart Logistics in order to speed up the distribution of COVID-19 testing kits. That same month, Lasarow became a key figure in establishing the Laboratory and Testing Industry Organisation, a group fighting for tighter industry standards and greater protections of consumers against unfair pricing.

Following the emergence of the Omicron variant of the virus, from December 2021 the UK required anyone entering its borders to take a PCR test from a private provider and quarantine until returning a negative. During this period, many consumers accused testing providers of advertising cheap kits, whilst masking hidden costs. Lasarow defended the government and criticised other providers for misleading consumers, stating "I think governments are doing their absolute best as they can as the [coronavirus testing] market matures to put guidelines and regulations in place. Problems occur if companies or individuals take advantage of that". The Future of Aviation Group, a cross-party organisation, responded with calls for the government to make testing free for all travellers.

== Personal life ==
Lasarow is also a philanthropist, and mentors young people and aspiring entrepreneurs in both the United Kingdom and South Africa through the City Livery Company. He is a resident of Kent, and is married to Kelly and has five children. His pastimes include fitness and cycling.

== Recognition ==
In 2011, Lasarow was appointed an Honorary Consul for South Africa to the United Kingdom by President Jacob Zuma, becoming the youngest person to receive the accolade. In January 2012, he acted as a representative for South Africa at the memorial service for international cricketer Basil D'Oliveira, held at Worcester Cathedral. He was reappointed as an honorary consul in 2015. Lasarow also has the distinction of being the first South African inducted into the City of London’s Guild of Entrepreneurs, and is also a Freeman of the City of London.

In March 2022, Lasarow was invited to become one of the 30 founding members of the Health Board, a new outfit launched by the Confederation of British Industry (CBI), which is designed to unite business, government and civil society around improving health outcomes across the UK.

=== Awards ===
Personal awards for Lasarow include:

- African Businessman of the Year at the 2014 African Enterprise Awards.
- Innovation of the Year at the 2015 Lloyds Bank National Business Awards.
- Innovator of the Year at the 2015 South African Chamber of Commerce Awards.

Additionally, DNAFit won the Spark of Innovation at the ukactive and Matrix Flame Awards in 2014. In 2018, they received two medals from the Queen's Awards for Enterprise and a Board of Trade Award from the UK's Department for International Trade at a ceremony in Cape Town, attended by the then British Prime Minister Theresa May during her 2018 South African trip.
