= K11 ECOAST =

Shopping mall in Shenzhen

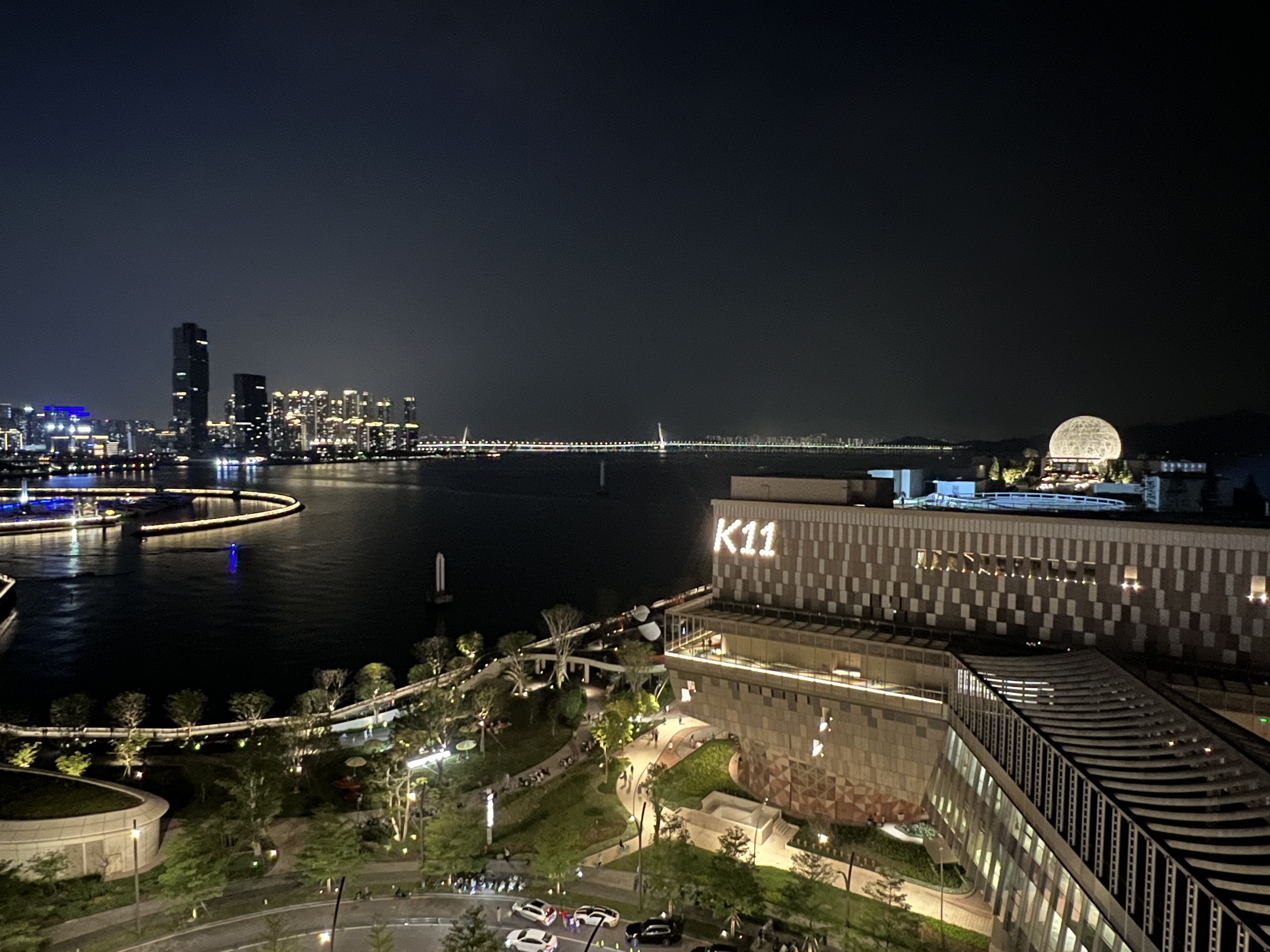
- K11 ECOAST at night
- Location: Nanshan, Shenzhen
- Address: 56-61, Taiziwan Road, Nanshan, Shenzhen
- Opened: April 28, 2025; 18 months ago
- Developer: New World Development, China Merchants Group
- Owner: New World Development, China Merchants Group
- Architect: OMA, David Chipperfield
- Num. of stores: 400 (Full Capacity)
- Floors: 10
- Public transit: Taiziwan, Line 12, Shenzhen Metro
- Website: https://www.nwcl.com.cn/en/property/developments/shenzhen-prince-bay-project

K11 ECOAST is a mixed-use development on the harborfront of Shekou in Nanshan, Shenzhen.

With a floor area of 228,500 square meters, the development consist of retail center K11 Art Mall, exhibition space HACC, office tower ATELIER, and harborfront walkway The Promenade. The site neighbors Shekou Cruise Center, Sea World, and Shekou Container Terminal, and is connected by Taiziwan Station of Line 12.

The complex is developed by a consortium of New World China Land (Subsidiary of New World Development) and China Merchants Shekou (Subsidiary of China Merchants Group). Rotterdam-based firm OMA and Hong Kong-based Ronald Lu & Partners are the architect for this project. Notably, Pritzker laureate David Chipperfield and renowned Japanese architect Sou Fujimoto were also credited for the design.

The early phase of design tendering began as early as 2014, yet New World Development, which carries the K11 trademark, did not join the consortium until 2020. The complex was initially projected to open by phase from 2024 and on. However, due to delays, only HACC was opened in late 2024 and the rest of the complex was only opened to public on April 28, 2025.

== Layout ==
=== Art Mall ===
The 10-storey retail complex comprises two pavilions, North and South, together providing space for 400 tenants. Two pavilions are connected by an overpass on Level 2 and 3. Echoing the theme of art, culture, and sustainability, the interior decor centers around wooden facades and plant pools dubbed 'green belt'.

The pavilions are slightly differentiated in terms of their target audiences. North, following the muted theme color and clad in more premium decors, is set to house premium fashion brands; while south, covered in brighter tones plans to cater family visitors with recreational amenities.

=== HACC ===
K11 ECOAST
- Chinese: 深圳 K11 ECOAST
- Traditional Chinese: 深圳 K11 ECOAST
Transcriptions
Standard Mandarin
- Hanyu Pinyin: shēn zhèn K11 ECOAST
Yue: Cantonese
- Jyutping: san1 zam3 K11 ECOAST

The HACC is a mixed-use annex to the west of the retail building, designed by David Chipperfield. The three-storey building includes spaces for dining, retail, and its primary purpose- exhibition and cultural activities. The building can be accessed from four directions, one of them through a footbridge connecting the Art Mall. The center welcomed its inaugural show in March, 2025, multimedia exhibition DOKU: the flow by Chinese artist Lu Yang. It also neighbors another established art center, owned by Sea World, SWCAC.

== Tenants ==
Anchoring MUJI, arcade chain MELAND, and toy store POP MART, the mall is opened with a fraction of retail spaces leased and operating. Some other tenants include DOCUMENT, M Stand Coffee, and Toys "R" Us. A house brand theater, Art House, is scheduled to open in months from the mall's launch.

As of May, 2025, several retail spaces on 6th Floor are used for pop-up exhibitions and cat cafes.

== Reception ==
The initial reception from local media outlets expressed vocal disappointments, focusing the discontent on the lackluster portfolio of initial tenants. The critics claim the final presentation is a far cry from the proposal, and consequent high expectations. Despite the flattering marketing from NWD, that the development is modelled after Victoria Dockside of Hong Kong, and is bound to evolve into its 2.0 version, critics are upset at its underwhelming tenant size of merely 1/10 of the mall's capacity. It is also noticed that none of major international fashion brands, nor niche designer brand from the developments home base Hong Kong were featured, contrary to the rosy marketing. Some other visitors frown upon the fuzzy detailing, underlining multiple instances of erroneous promotional materials, citing specifically an unintelligible coupon poster.

== Gallery ==
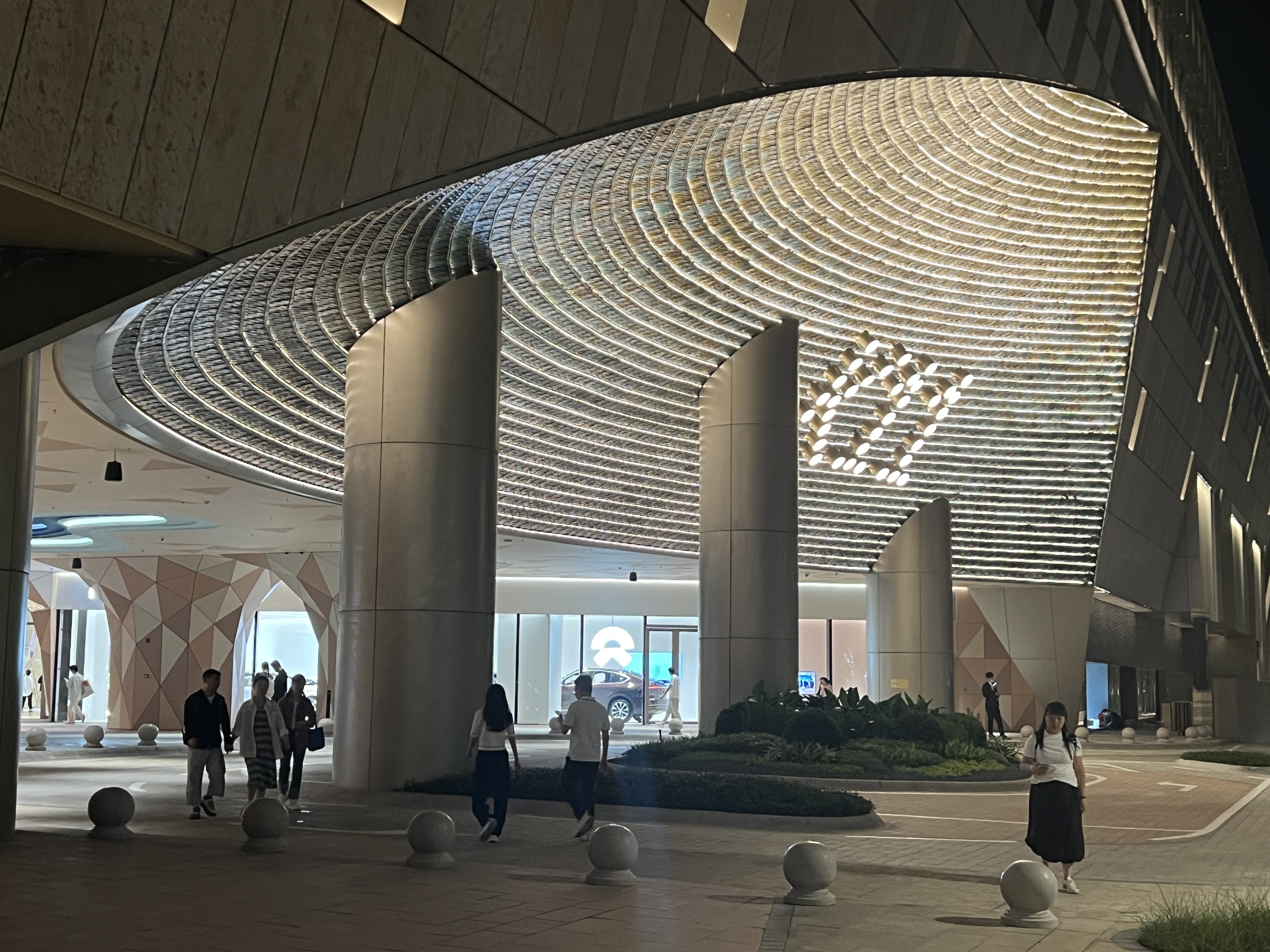
View of an entrance to the Art Mall

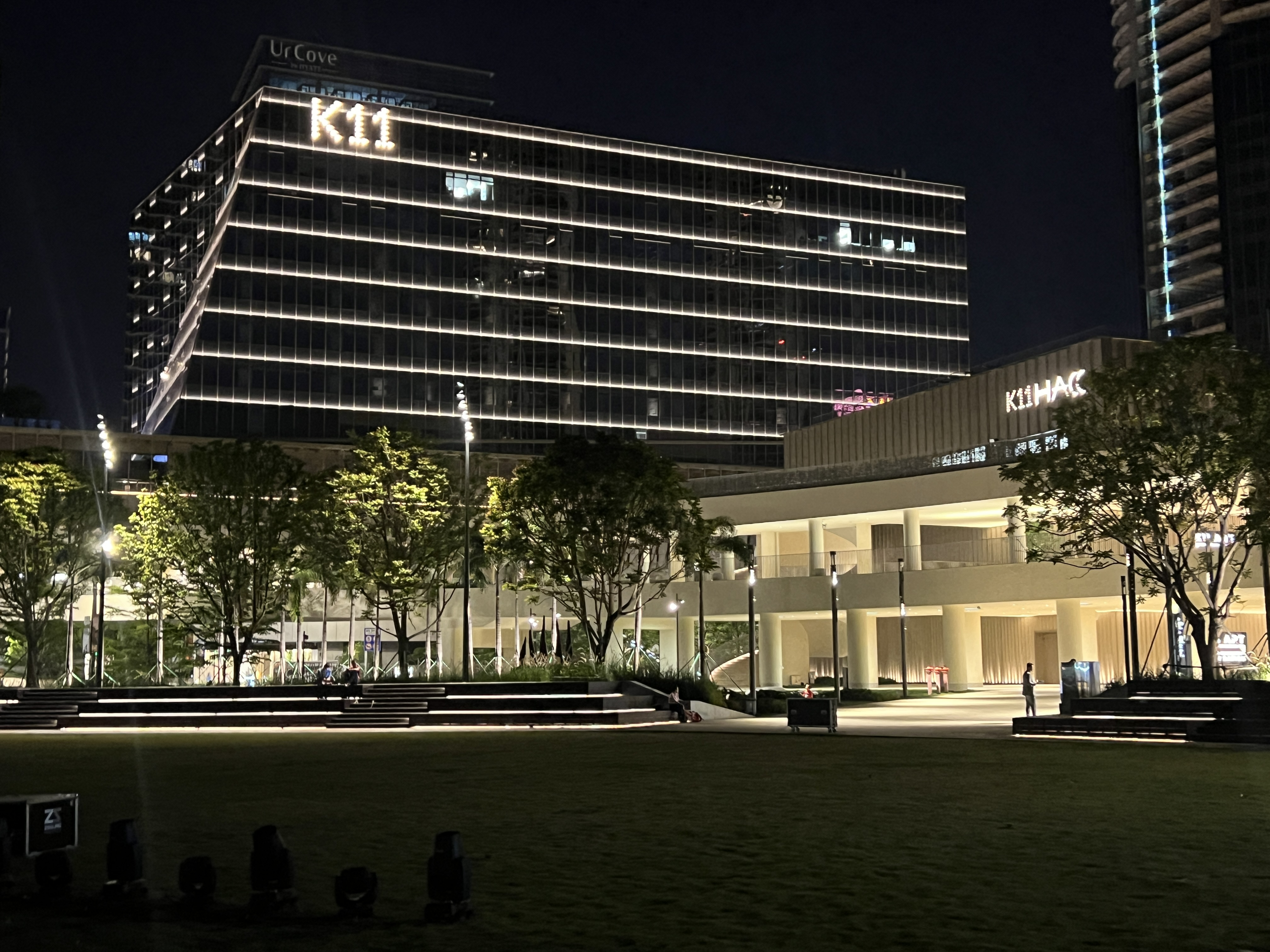
Exteriot view of the ATELIER office

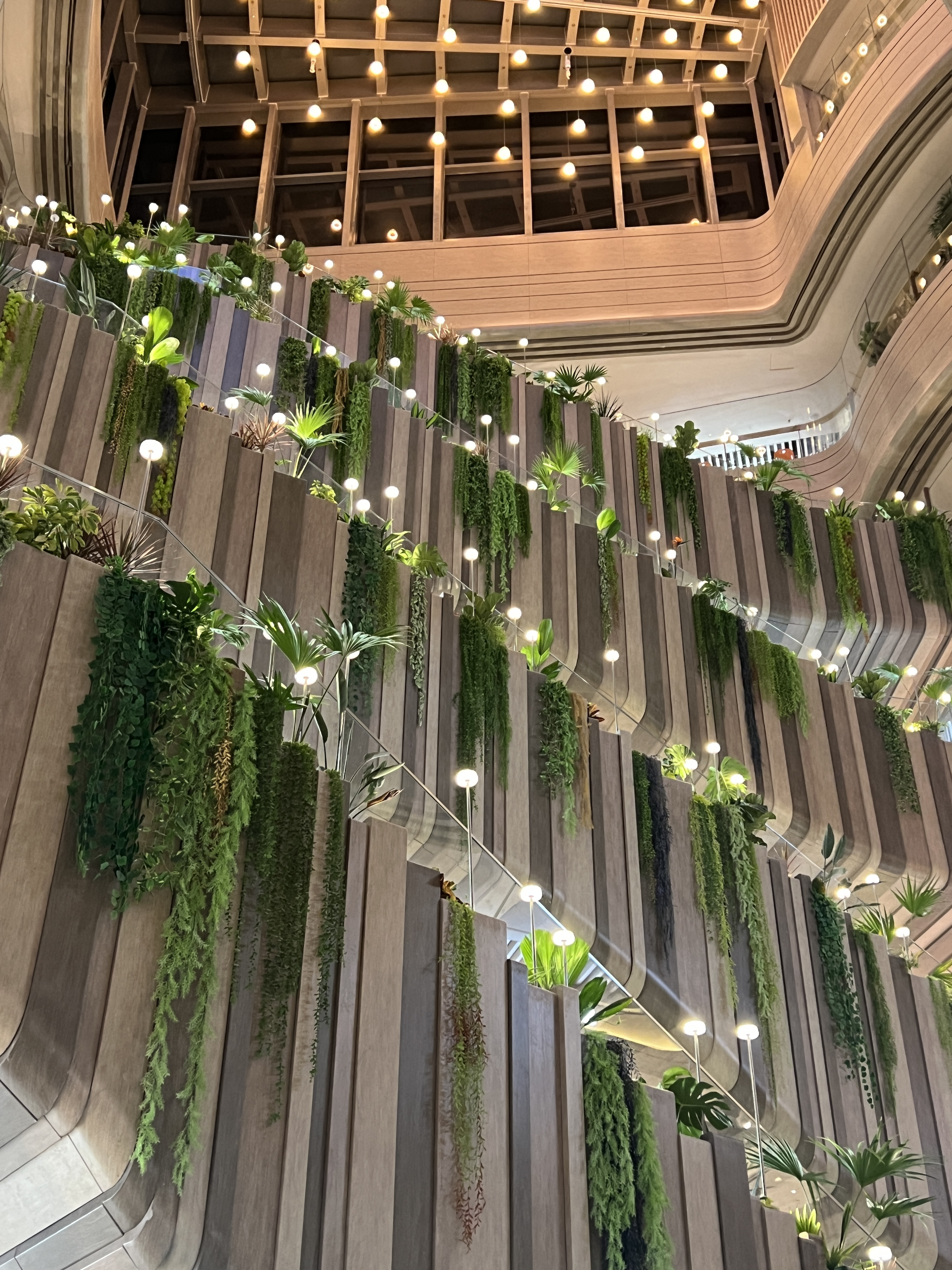
Decoration of South Pavilion atrium

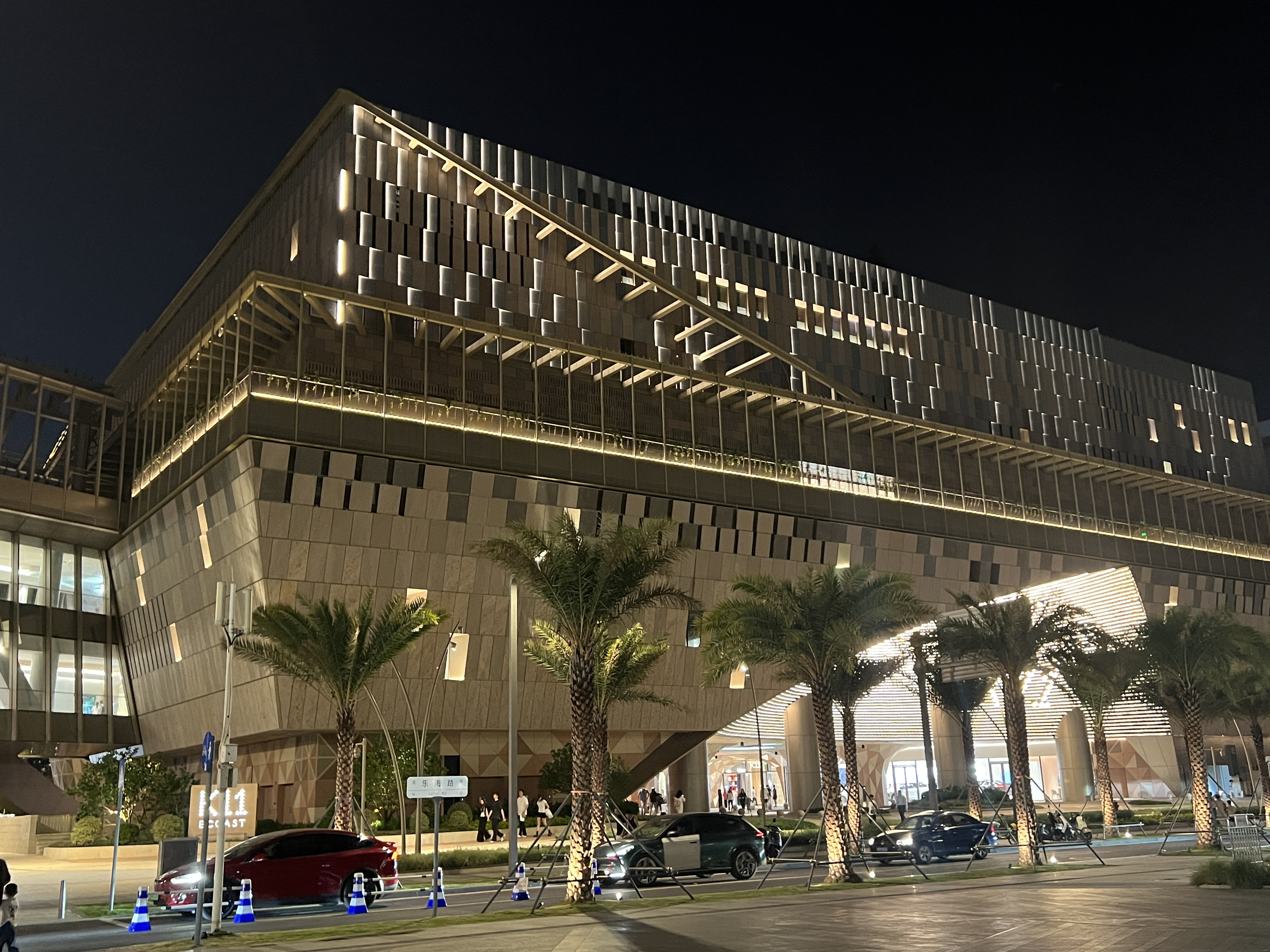
Exterior view of the Art Mall

== See also ==
- K11 Art Mall
- K11 Musea
- K11 Shanghai
- New World Development
- New World China Land
- K11 Art Foundation
