= Wu Hao =

Wu Hao or Hao Wu is the name of:

- Wu Hao (artist) (吳昊, 1932–2019), Taiwanese artist
- Wu Hao (footballer) (吴昊, born 1983), Chinese footballer
- Hao Wu (biochemist) (吴皓), Chinese-American biochemist
- Hao Wu (director) (吴皓, born 1972), Chinese-American director
- Wu Hao (actor) (吴昊, born 2000), Chinese actor
- Wu Hao (politician, born 1972) (吴浩), a Chinese politician.
