= Hanoi Road =

Street in Tsim Sha Tsui, Hong Kong

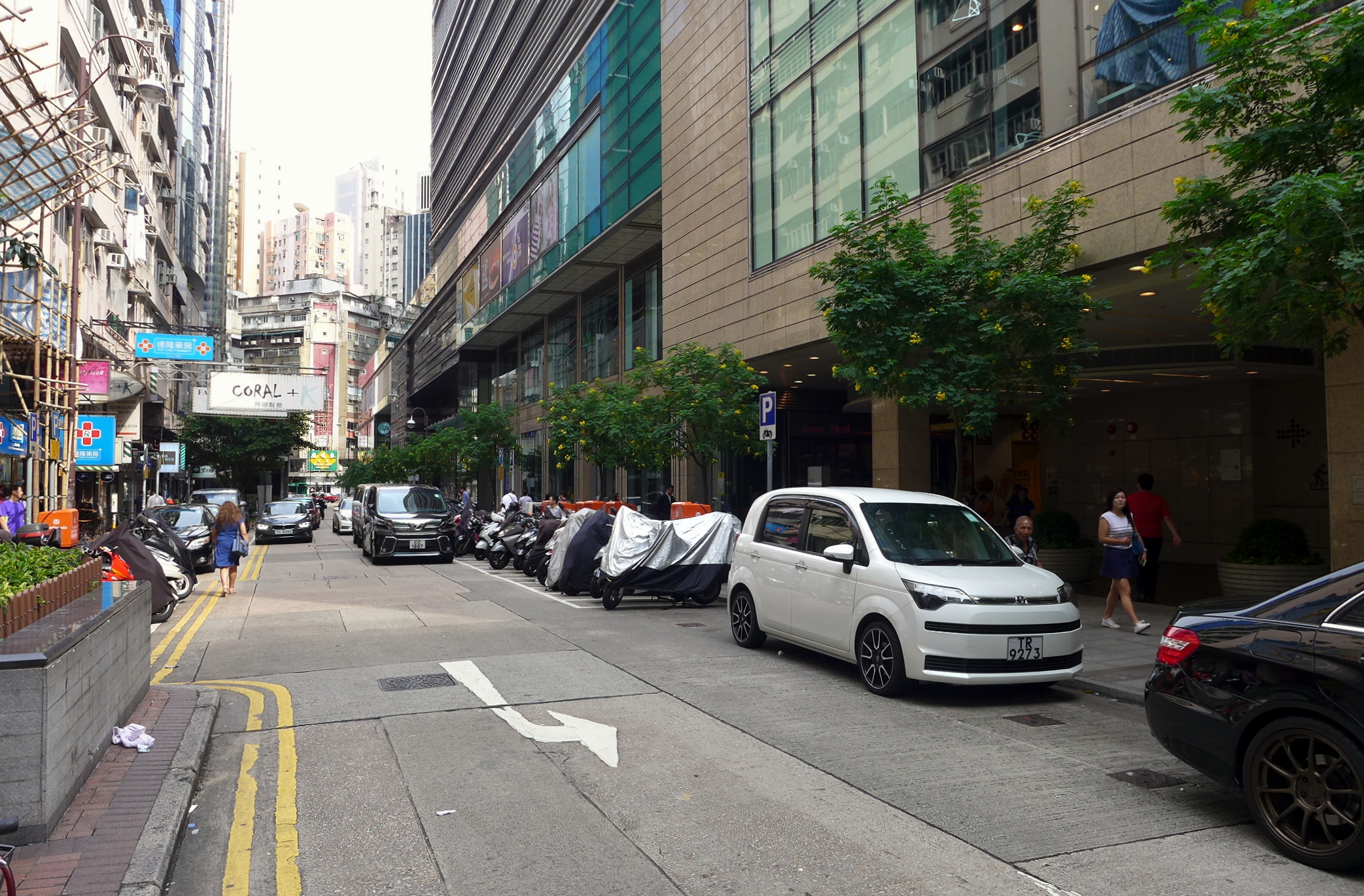
Hanoi Road in July 2016

Hanoi Road (Chinese: 河內道) is a short road between Carnarvon Road and Mody Road in Tsim Sha Tsui, Kowloon, Hong Kong. It was built in 1892 and opened to traffic in 1893 as “East Road”. It originally started at Chatham Road. After the construction of Mody Road, the easternmost part of Hanoi Road was also named Mody Road. In 1908, the name was changed to Hanoi Road, named after the capital city of Vietnam.

Almost an entire block west of the road was redeveloped in the early 2000s for the construction of the Masterpiece, a skyscraper featuring K11, a shopping mall. Exits N1 and N2 of the East Tsim Sha Tsui MTR station is located on the road.

== See also ==
- List of streets and roads in Hong Kong
