= Cheng Yu-tung =

Hong Kong businessman

Dato The Honourable Cheng Yu-tung GBM
- Born: August 26, 1925; Shunde, Guangdong, Republic of China
- Died: September 29, 2016 (aged 91); Hong Kong, China
- Spouse: Chow Tsui-ying
- Children: 4
- Relatives: Chow Chi-yuen (father-in-law), Henry Kar-shun Cheng (son) Adrian Cheng Chi-kong (grandson)

Cheng Yu-tung
- Traditional Chinese: 鄭裕彤
- Simplified Chinese: 郑裕彤
Transcriptions
Standard Mandarin
- Hanyu Pinyin: Zhèng Yùtóng
Yue: Cantonese
- Jyutping: zeng6 jyu6 tung4
- Sidney Lau: Jeng^{6} Yue^{6} Tung^{4}

Cheng Yu-tung GBM (Chinese: 鄭裕彤; 8 August 1925 – 29 September 2016) was a Hong Kong billionaire with extensive property investment, development and service businesses, hotels, infrastructure, jewellery retailing and transportation interests in Hong Kong, Macau, United States, Australia and other areas. He was considered to be Hong Kong's third richest man at the time of his death.

== Early life ==
Cheng was born in rural Shunde District in Guangdong, the son of a tailor, and fled to Macau in 1940, ahead of the advancing Japanese occupation force. The goldsmith owner of the Chow Tai Fook store there took him on as an apprentice and he eventually married the boss's daughter. They moved to Hong Kong in 1946 and opened the company's first store there.

== Business career ==
He founded and owned Chow Tai Fook Enterprises, a conglomerate which operates the Sheraton Marina hotel and controls the publicly listed property developer New World group, which Cheng founded in 1970. Cheng's wealth originated from his jewellery business, Chow Tai Fook. Cheng's grandson, Adrian Cheng Chi-kong, is set to inherit part of Chow Tai Fook and the Hong Kong-listed New World group, active in property and infrastructure. He also had interests in Shun Tak Holdings, and Macau casino operator Sociedade de Turismo e Diversoes de Macau, owned by Stanley Ho. In July 1972, Cheng and Ho bought the title to the Jumbo Floating Restaurant after it was burned down. The restaurant boat was rebuilt for HK$30 million and began operation in 1976.

Cheng was a one-time real-estate investment partner of Donald Trump.

Shortly before his death, Forbes listed him 58th wealthiest in the world and 3rd in Hong Kong with US$16.6 billion, and was at one time listed by Bloomberg as high as 34th.

Cheng also served on the board of Hang Seng Bank, Hong Kong's third-largest bank.

He represented the Kingdom of Bhutan in Hong Kong, serving as the honorary consul for the country.

== Personal life ==
In 1943, Cheng married Chow Tsui-ying, the daughter of Chow Chi-yuen. In 1946, Cheng and his family moved to Hong Kong. Cheng had four children, Henry Cheng, Peter Cheng, Amy Cheng, and Lai-ha Cheng.

Cheng's eldest son Henry Cheng (b.1946) is chairman of New World Development and related businesses.

=== Death ===
Cheng died on September 26, 2016, in Hong Kong, after a 2012 brain haemorrhage had left him bedridden.

== See also ==
- Chow Chi-yuen

Business positions
Preceded by Deacon Chiu	Chairman of the Asia Television; 1989–1990	Succeeded by Wong Po-yan
