= Taiziwan station =

Shenzhen Metro Line 12 station

Taiziwan 太子湾
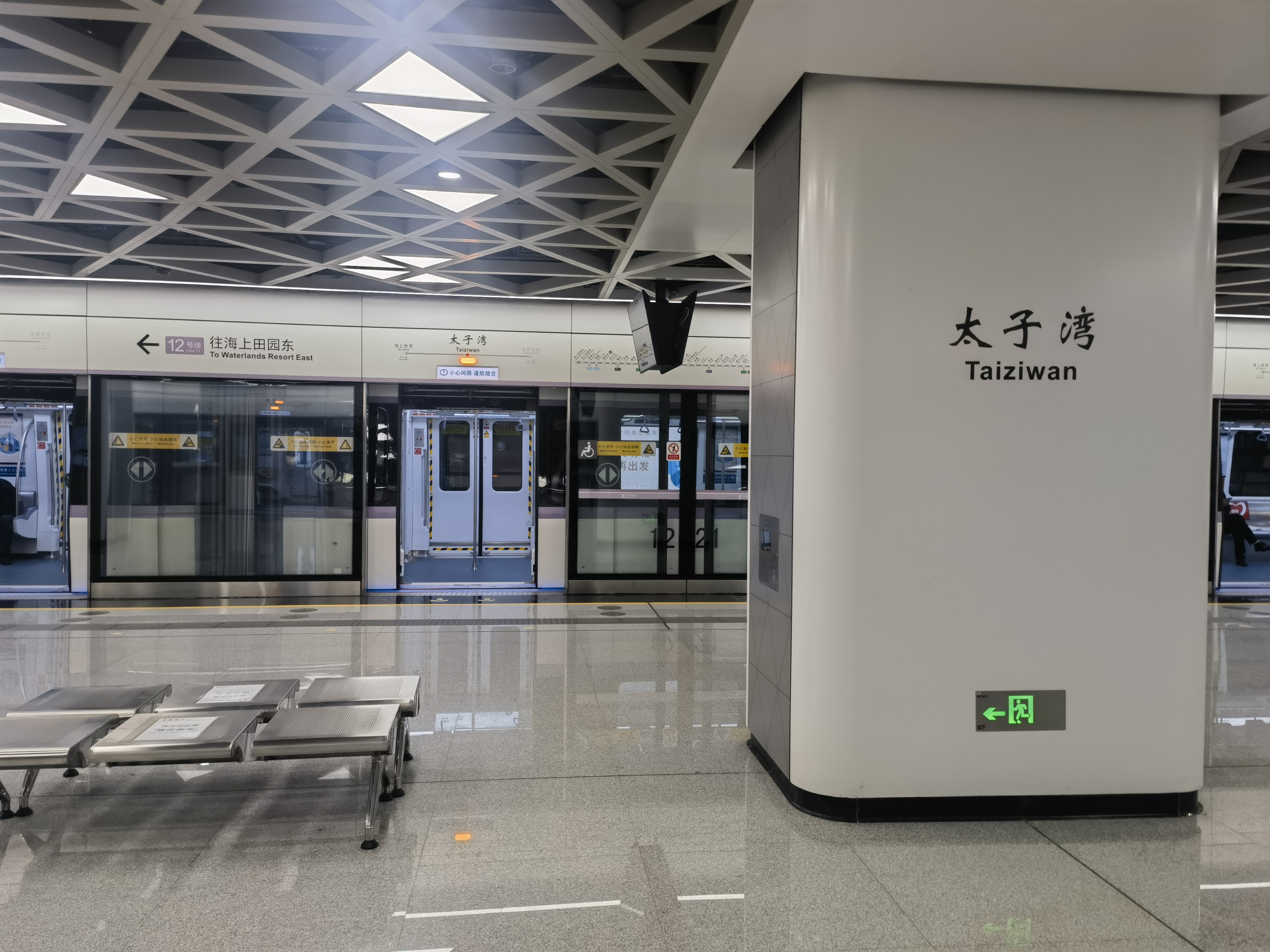
- Northbound platform of Taiziwan

Chinese name
- Chinese: 太子湾
Transcriptions
Standard Mandarin
- Hanyu Pinyin: Tàizǐ Wān
Yue: Cantonese
- Yale Romanization: Taaijí Wāan
- Jyutping: Taai3 Ji2 Waan1

General information
- Location: East of the intersection of Huihai Road and Cruise Ship Boulevard (west of Shekou Cruise Center); Nanshan District, Shenzhen, Guangdong; China
- Coordinates: 22°28′34″N 113°54′25″E
- Operated by: Shenzhen Line 12 Rail Transit Co., Ltd (Shenzhen Metro Group and PowerChina PPP)
- Line: Line 12
- Platforms: 2 (1 island platform)
- Tracks: 2

Construction
- Structure type: Underground
- Accessible: Yes

History
- Opened: 28 November 2022 (3 years ago)

Services
Preceding station	Shenzhen Metro	Following station
Sea World towards Songgang	Line 12	Zuopaotai East Terminus
Location

Taiziwan station (Chinese: 太子湾站; pinyin: Tàizǐ Wān Zhàn; Cantonese Yale: Taaijí Wāan Jaahm) is a metro station on Line 12 of Shenzhen Metro. It was opened on 28 November 2022.

== Station layout ==
The station has an island platform under Huihai Road.

G	–	Exit
B1F	–	Connecting passages
B2F; Concourse	Lobby	Ticket Machines, Customer Service, Station Control Room
B3F; Platforms	Platform	12 towards Songgang (Sea World)
B3F; Platforms	Island platform, doors will open on the left
B3F; Platforms	Platform	12 towards Zuopaotai East (Terminus)

=== Entrances/exits ===
The station has 5 points of entry/exit. Exits A, B1 and C are accessible via elevators. Exit A provides access to the Shekou Cruise Center. Exit D1 is not open.

Exit		Destination
Exit A		Cruise Ship Boulevard (E), Shekou Cruise Center, Merchants Jiyu Building, Taiziwan–Yunxi, Taiziwan–Wanxi
Exit B1		Taiziwan–Yunxi, K11 ECOAST
Exit C		Taiziwan Road (W)
Exit D	D1 (not open)	Cruise Ship Boulevard (W), Taiziwan–Wanxi
Exit D	D2	Cruise Ship Boulevard (W), Taiziwan–Wanxi

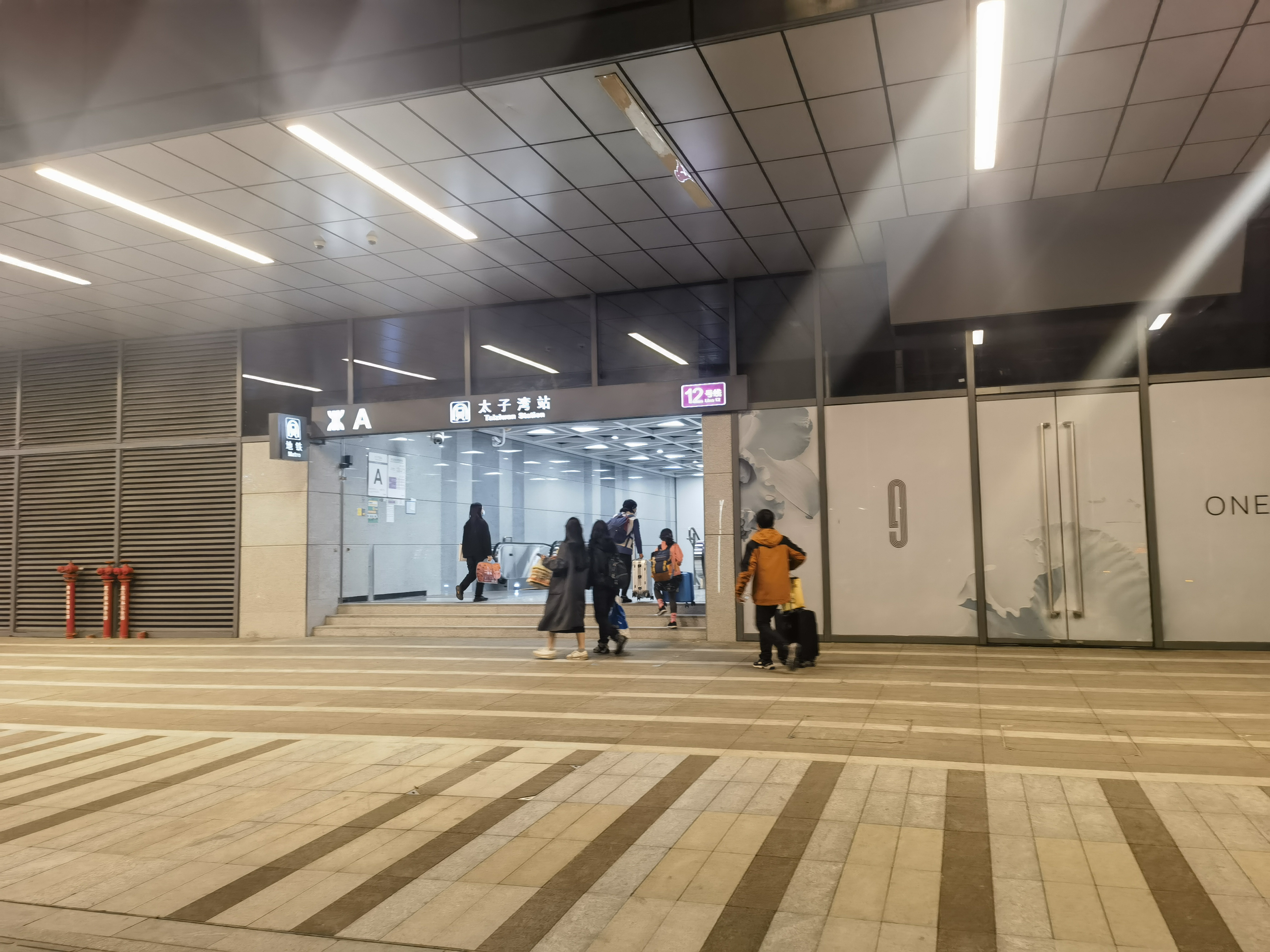
Entrance A

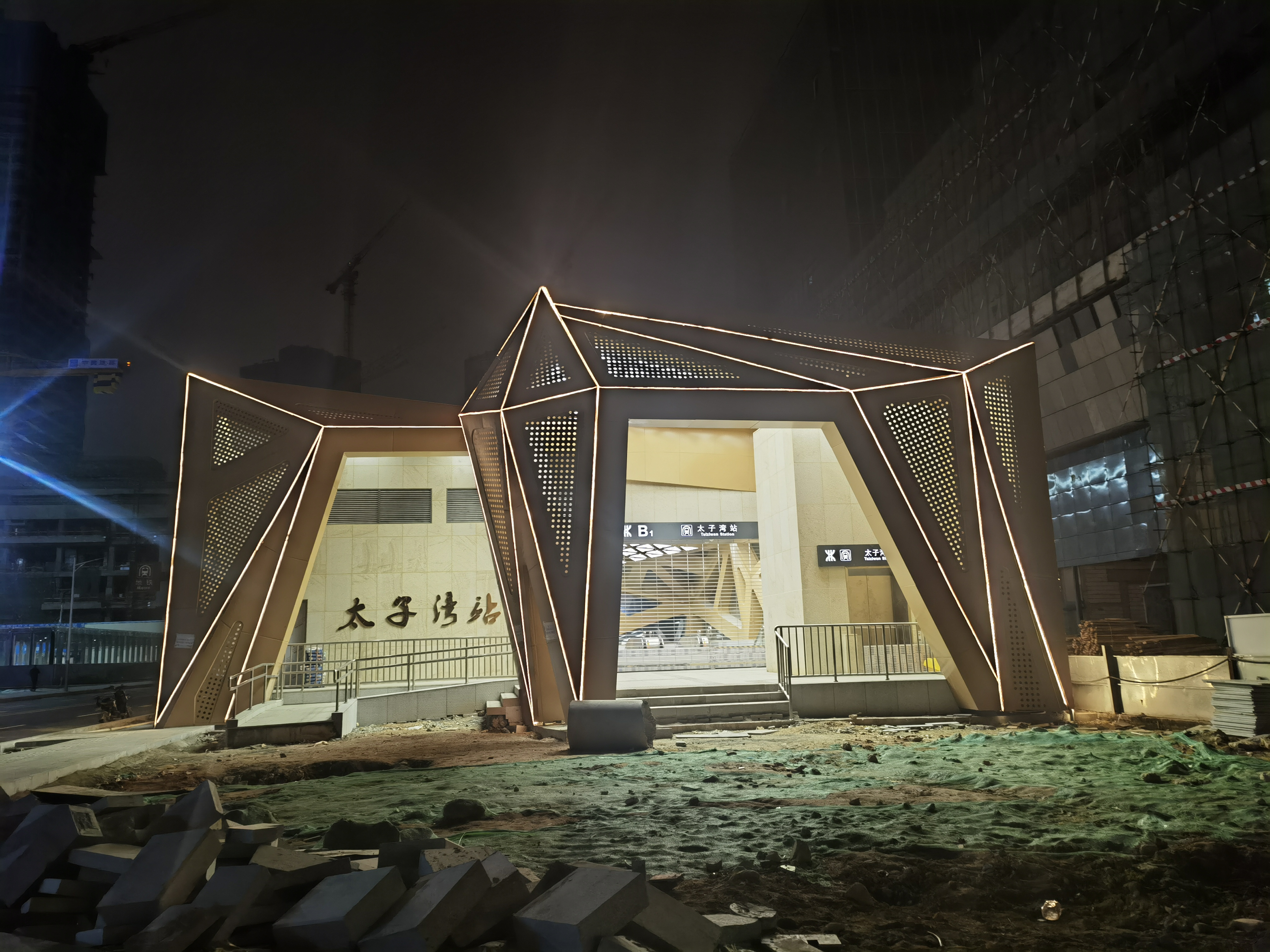
Entrance B1

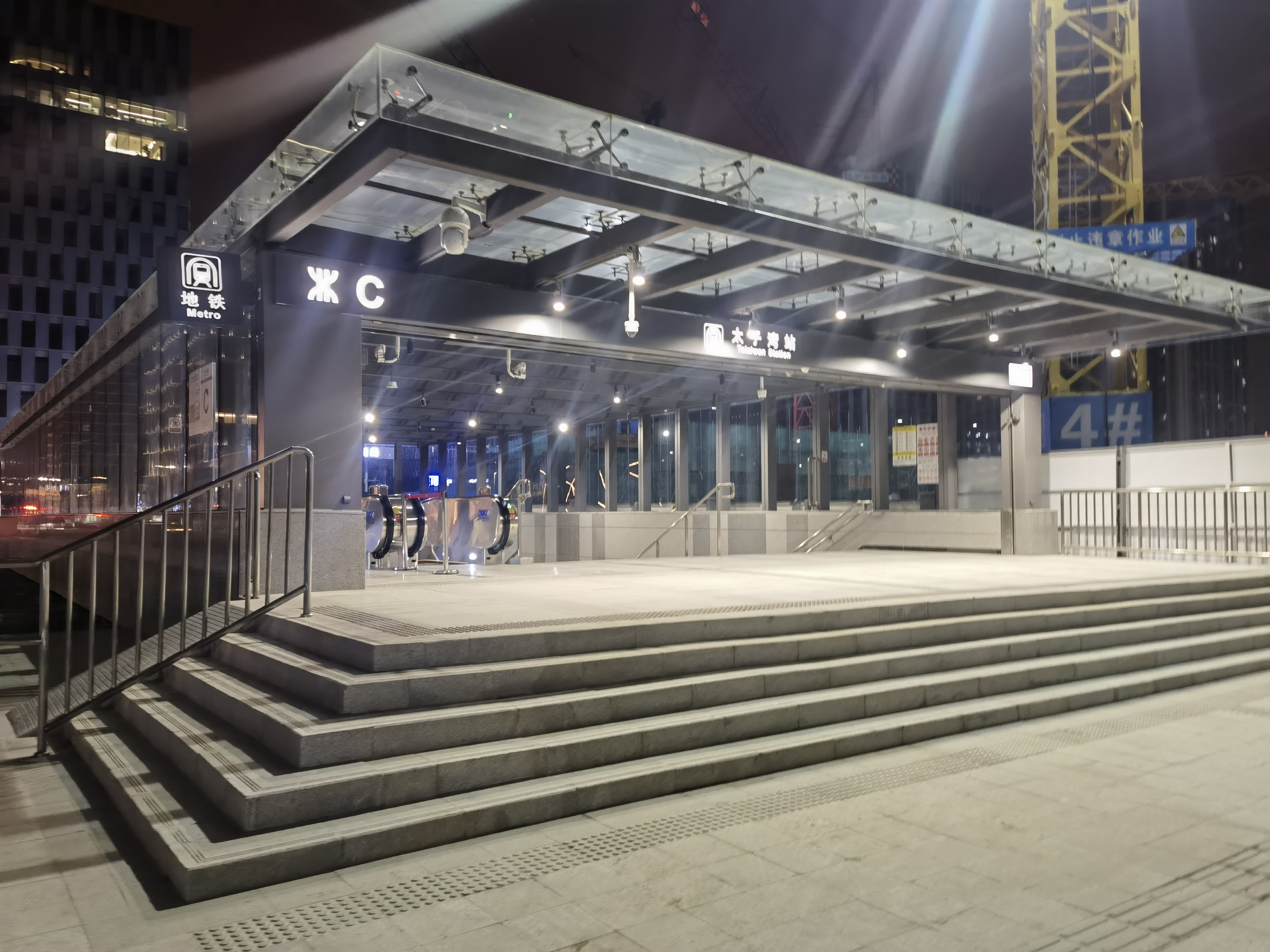
Entrance C

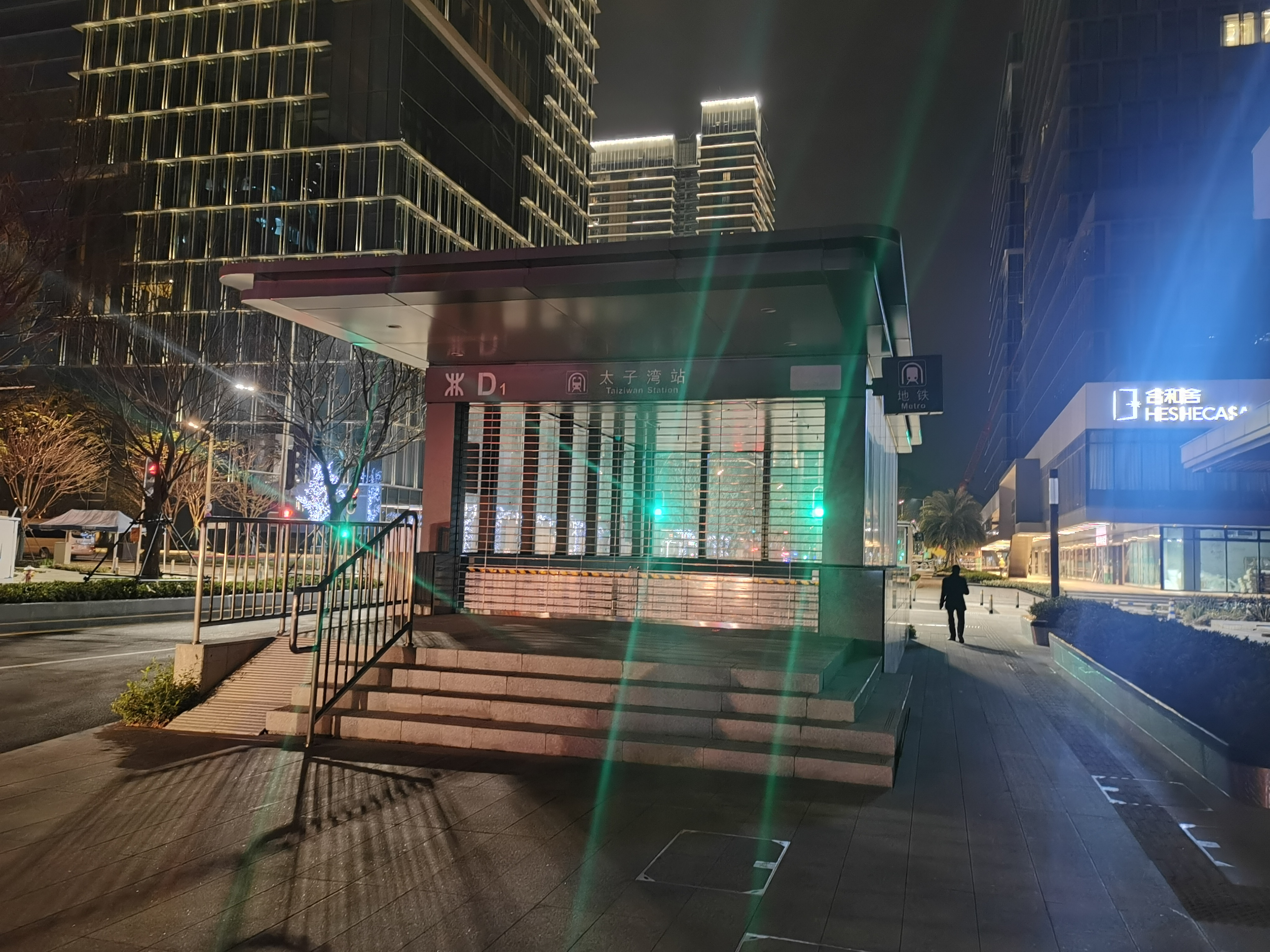
Entrance D1

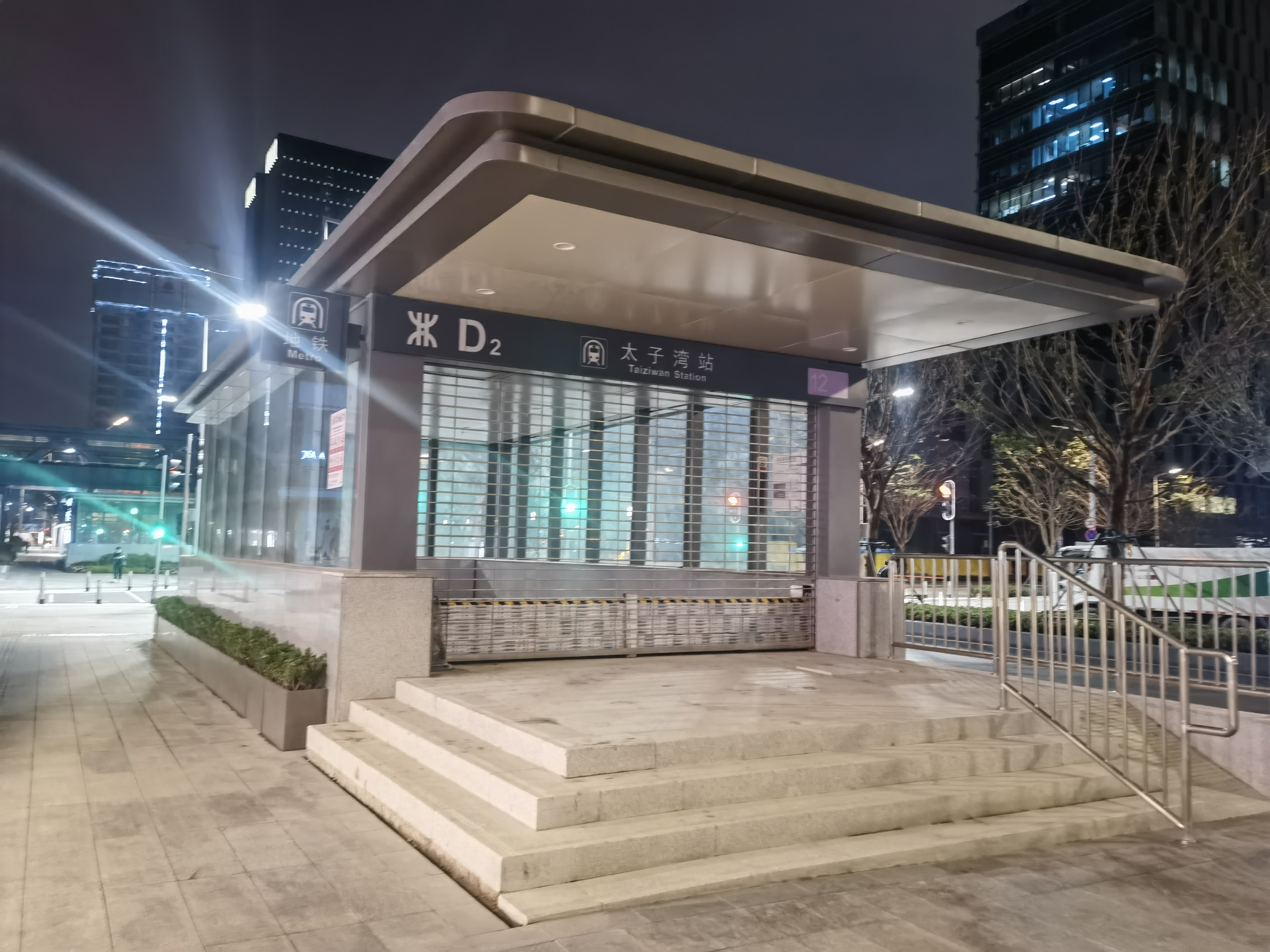
Entrance D2

== Gallery ==
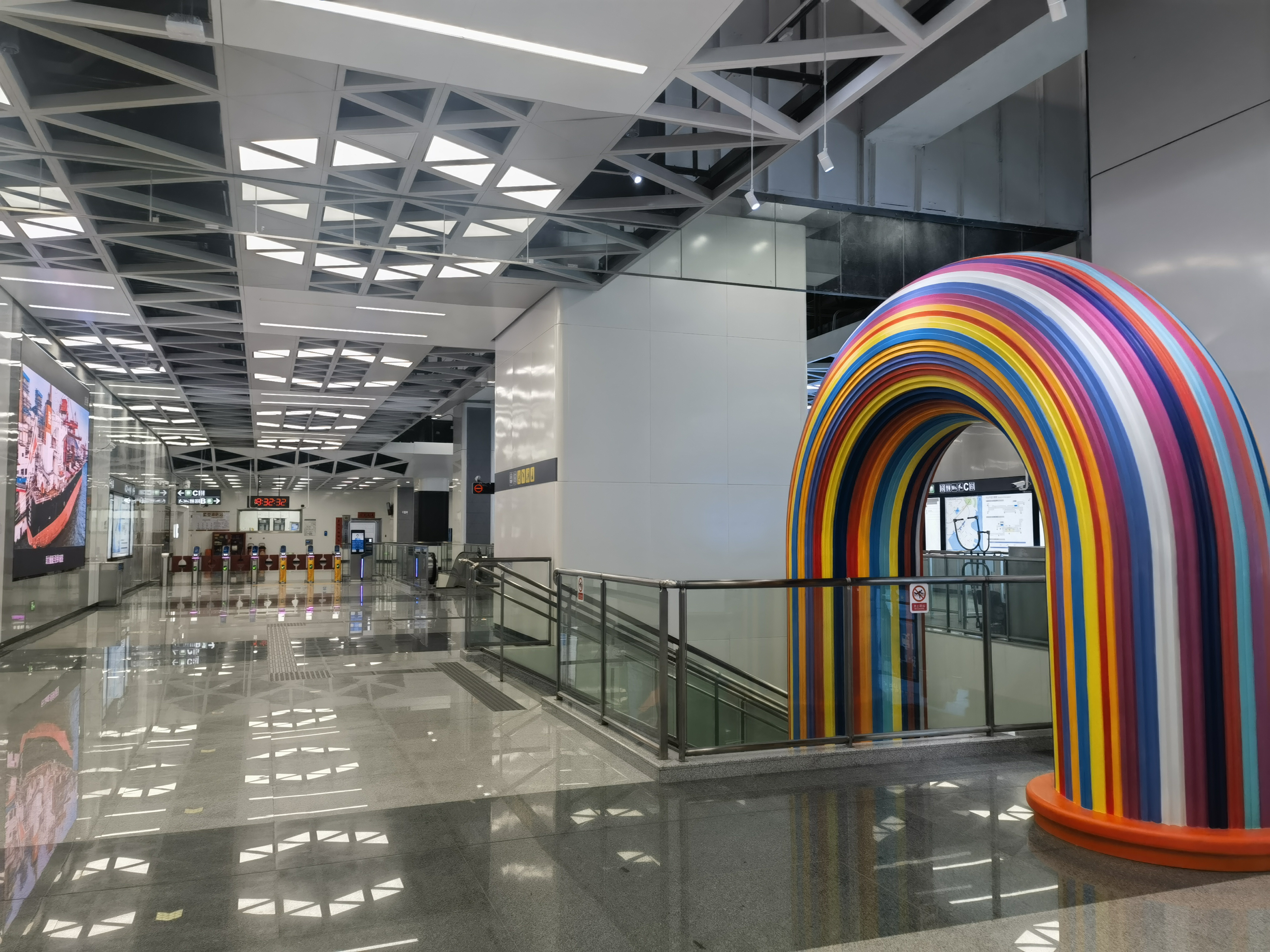
Art installation 1

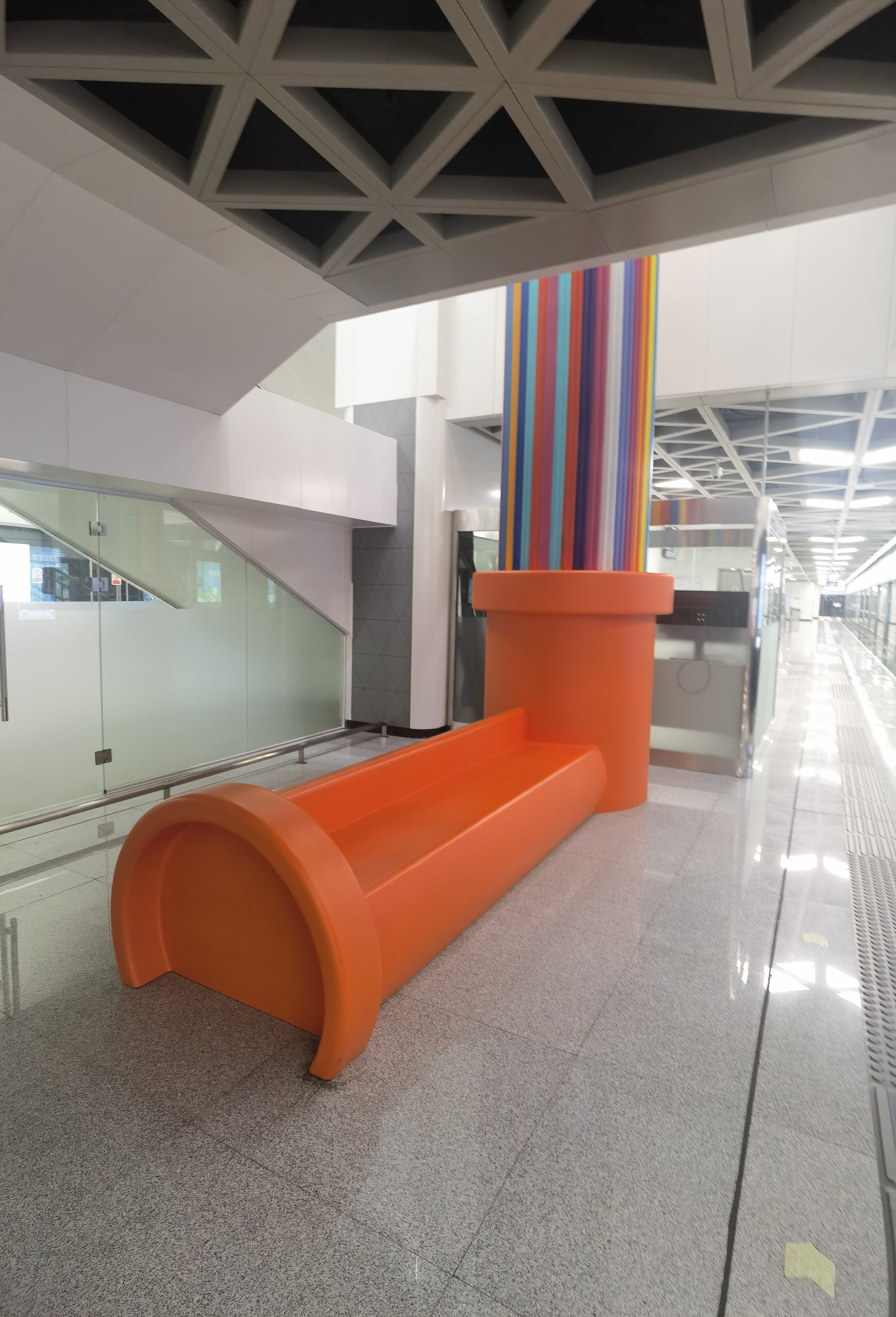
Art installation 2
