= The Masterpiece (Hong Kong) =

Building in Tsim Sha Tsui, Hong Kong

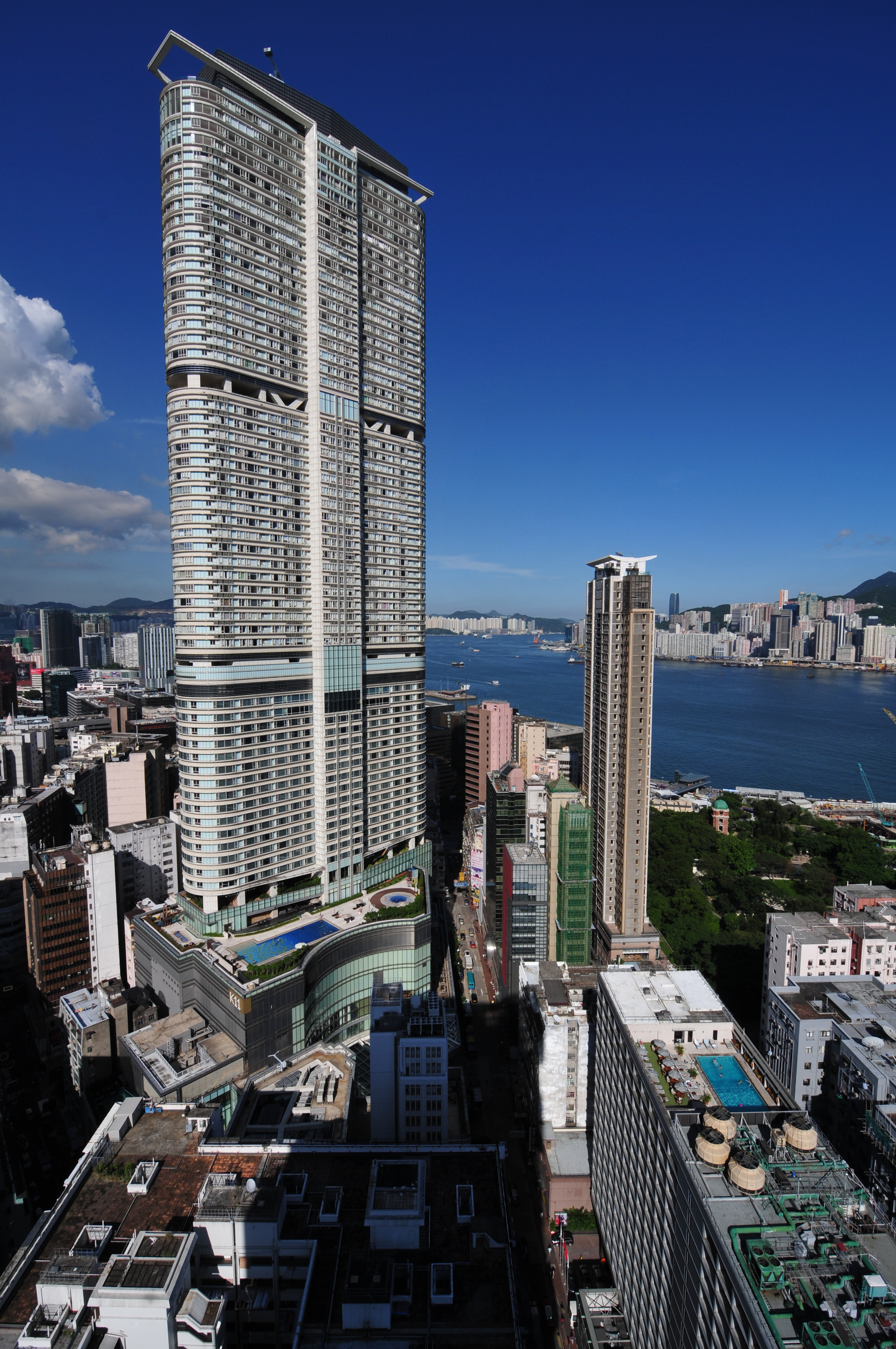
- The Masterpiece, 2013
- Interactive map of the The Masterpiece area

General information
- Location: Tsim Sha Tsui, Kowloon, Hong Kong
- Coordinates: 22°17′51″N 114°10′26″E
- Construction started: 2002; 24 years ago
- Completed: 2007; 19 years ago

Height
- Antenna spire: 261 m (856 ft)
- Roof: 241.7 m (793 ft)

Technical details
- Floor count: 64

The Masterpiece
- Traditional Chinese: 名鑄
- Simplified Chinese: 名铸
Transcriptions
Standard Mandarin
- Hanyu Pinyin: Míngzhù
Yue: Cantonese
- Yale Romanization: Mìhng jyu
- Jyutping: Ming4 zyu3

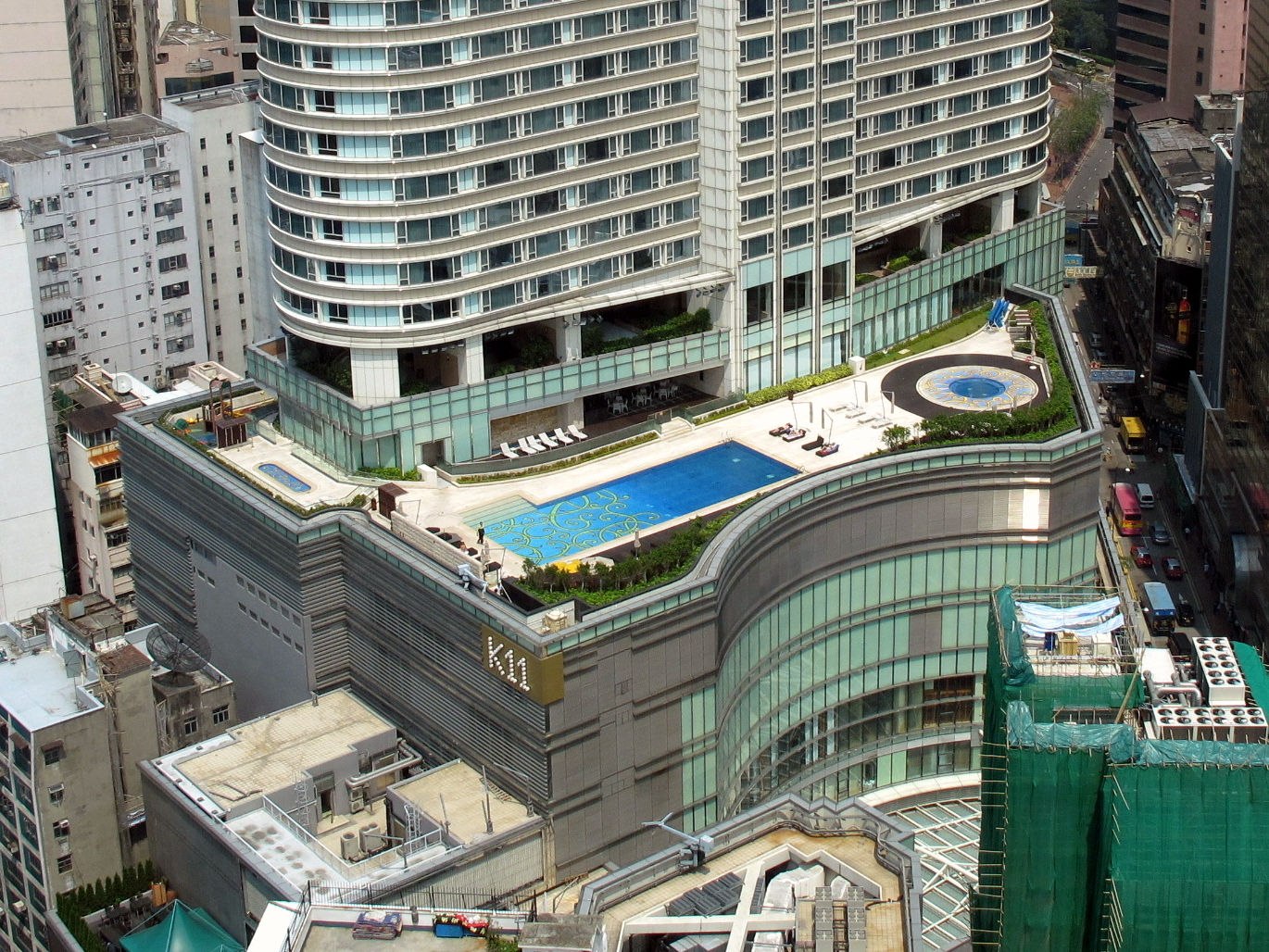
The Masterpiece

The Masterpiece is a 64-floor, 261 metre (856 ft) tall luxury apartment in Tsim Sha Tsui, Kowloon Peninsula, Hong Kong. It houses the six-storey K11 shopping centre in the lower levels and basement. The 381-room Hyatt Regency hotel, located from Level 3 to 24, opened in October 2009. 345 luxury residential apartments occupy the 27th to 67th floors with penthouse apartment units located on the top floors of the building.

The complex is connected to both Tsim Sha Tsui and East Tsim Sha Tsui MTR stations via underground subway links with the K11 shopping centre.

== History ==
The project was jointly developed by New World Development and the Urban Renewal Authority (URA). The building, along with other URA projects, has been criticized for its destruction of built heritage, and for damaging the existing community by contributing to gentrification which pushes out the less well-off.

== Tenants ==
=== Hyatt Regency ===
The Hyatt Regency Hong Kong, Tsim Sha Tsui (Chinese: 香港尖沙咀凱悅酒店) is a 381-room hotel located from levels 3 to 24 of the complex. It opened on 2 October 2009.

The hotel's predecessor was located two blocks west, on Nathan Road. Opened in 1964 as The President Hotel, it was renamed the Hong Kong Hyatt Hotel on 1 November 1969, the first Hyatt Hotel established outside of the United States. Later renamed the Hyatt Regency Hong Kong, the hotel closed on 1 January 2006, and was demolished. The site of the hotel is now occupied by iSQUARE, a 31-storey shopping mall.

A total of 655 square metres (7,050 sq ft) is dedicated to meeting space, including a 4,111 square feet (381.9 m^{2}) ballroom and eight meeting rooms of different sizes. All meeting facilities are equipped with audio-visual technology and wireless internet connectivity.

The hotel also houses four restaurants:

- Hugo's (established in the original location in 1969)
- The Chinese Restaurant
- Chin Chin Bar (established in the original location in 1964)
- Cafe

=== K11 Art Mall ===
K11 Art Mall is a 31,600 square metres (340,000 sq ft), six-storey shopping centre in the lower levels of the complex developed by New World Development and completed in December 2009. It is marketed as an "art mall" as it incorporates various art displays.

== See also ==
- List of tallest buildings in Hong Kong
