= K11 Art Foundation =

Hong Kong contemporary art organisation

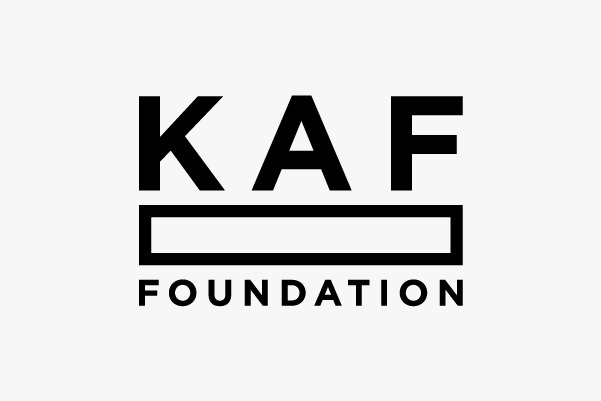
- Formation: 2010
- Founder: Adrian Cheng
- Founded at: Hong Kong
- Website: www.kaf-arts.com

K11 Art Foundation: Founded by Dr. Adrian Cheng in 2010, K11 Art Foundation (KAF) is a non-profit organization in Hong Kong dedicated to fostering the development of Asian contemporary art.

== Exhibitions ==
Master of impressionism – Claude Monet

KAF organised, with the Musée Marmottan Monet, the first ever exhibition of Claude Monet in mainland China in 2014

The show included 40 original Monet paintings on loan from the Musée Marmottan Monet, including the Water Lily and Wisteria, and 12 original paintings by Impressionist artists Berthe Morisot and Pierre-Auguste Renoir. Half of the Monet paintings owned by Musée Marmottan Monet, were in the exhibition. The exhibition was organised in collaboration with the Musée Marmottan Monet and held at the Chi K11 Art Museum inside K11 Art Mall in Shanghai, from March 8 to June 15, 2014, and attracted 3,409,000 visitors.

The China Symposium in The Armory Show

KAF supported the China Symposium that was held on March 8–9 of the 2014 Armory Show.

It provided insight into the landscape of Chinese contemporary art by showcasing a selection of 17 established and emerging galleries from mainland China and Hong Kong, many of which had never exhibited outside China before. The China Symposium included speakers from Asia and other areas, including artists, journalists, curators, collectors, gallerists, and academics for conversations that elaborated on Chinese contemporary art. It presented an overview of the art scene in China.

Inside China - L'Intérieur du GÉant

The exhibition Inside China – L'Intérieur du Geant inaugurated a three-year collaboration between the K11 Art Foundation and Palais de Tokyo (Paris), that focused on showcasing emerging art scenes in China and France, with a series of presentations in both countries.

It was first exhibited at Palais de Tokyo (Paris) in October 2014, and moved to Hong Kong in 2015. Artists involved included Cheng Ran, Item Idem, Mathis Collins, Renaud Jerez, Li Gang, Edwin Lo, Jonathan Martin, Nadar, Aude Pariset, Wu Hao, Yu Ji and Zhao Yao.

The 2nd "CAFAM Future" Exhibition: The Reality Representation of Chinese Young Art

The exhibition was launched under a 3 years collaborative plan between KAF and Central Academy of Fine Art Museum (CAFAM), and this exhibition was devoted to discovering and supporting Chinese young art talents, which included over 90 Chinese artists. After the Beijing exhibition was held in January 2015, the Hong Kong exhibition was launched in May 2015.

Event Horizon

Event Horizon is a global public art installation project that displays large-scale public sculpture installations by English artist Sir Antony Gormley. KAF is a partner of Event Horizon of Hong Kong station, which was presented by the British Council in November 2015. 31 sculptures by Antony Gormley were installed across a kilometer wide zone of Hong Kong Central and Western district at both street level and building tops. Hong Kong was the first Asian city to stage those sculptures following presentations in London, Rotterdam, New York, São Paulo and Rio de Janeiro.

Media—Dalí

KAF co-operated with Gala-Salvador Dalí Foundation to launch a temporary exhibition named Media-Dalí from 5 Nov 2015 to 15 Feb 2016 at Chi K11 Art Museum in K11 Art Mall in Shanghai. 240 original works and media works by Salvador Dalí were selected from archives in Figueres, Spain.

Shanghai Gesture included Chinese contemporary painters Wang Xingwei (simplified Chinese: 王兴伟; traditional Chinese: 王興偉), Zhou Tiehai (simplified Chinese: 周铁海; traditional Chinese: 周鐵海), and Zhang Enli (simplified Chinese: 张恩利; traditional Chinese: 張恩利).

WE: A Community of Chinese Contemporary Artists

Presented by KAF at Chi K11 Art Museum in K11 Art Mall in Shanghai, WE: A Community of Chinese Contemporary Artists featured over 50 artworks in different mediums including painting, sculpture, installation, performance art and theatre performance.

Other exhibitions

- Billboard Project - Felix Gonzalez-Torres - On view at tram shelters: Date: 02.03.2015 – 29.03.2015, On view at K11 Art Mall: Date: 09.03.2015 – 17.03.2015
- The Tell-Tale Heart - 12.03.2015 – 17.04.2015
- Chai Wan Mei Art and Design Festival 2015 - 14.03.2015 – 15.03.2015
- Tianzhou Chen Solo Exhibition – 24.06.2015 – 06.09.2015
- Cinematheque. Venue: chi K11 Shanghai Art Museum – 16.03.2015 – 31.05.2015

== Collaborating organisations ==
K11 Art Foundation collaborates with Palais de Tokyo (Paris), Musee Marmottan in Paris, the Metropolitan Museum of Art, and the Armory Show in New York, Institutes of Contemporary Art, London (ICA), Centre Pompidou (Paris) and the Gala - Salvador Dalí Foundation.

Other collaborators include:

- Academy of Arts & Design, Tsinghua University
- China Central Academy of Fine Arts
- College of Fine Arts, Seoul National University
- College of Fine Arts, Hongik University
- Fondazione Sandretto Re Rebaudengo — presenting Xin Liu's Exhaust, Turin, 2026
- MoMA PS1 — co-organised .com/.cn, Hong Kong, 2017
- Museum of Contemporary Art, Los Angeles — presented the digital programme SCREEN x KAF: Transpacific Stream, 2021
- New Museum — co-presented After us at chi K11 Art Museum, Shanghai, 2017
- Serpentine Galleries — co-presented Hack Space, Shanghai, 2016

== See also ==
- K11 (Hong Kong)
- K11 (Shanghai)
