= Test to Release =

COVID-19 testing scheme launched in the United Kingdom

Test to Release is a COVID-19 testing scheme launched in the United Kingdom. The scheme began operating in England on 15 December 2020, and allows travellers required to quarantine upon returning to England to pay privately for a COVID test five days after their arrival. They are then permitted to end their quarantine period immediately if they receive a negative test. The scheme's launch was beset by chaos on the day of its launch as the eleven private firms chosen by the UK government to administer the tests encountered teething problems.
