= Wu Hao (artist) =

Taiwanese artist (1932–2019)

Wu Hao (Chinese: 吳昊; 23 October 1932 – 29 March 2019) was a Taiwanese contemporary visual artist who was known for his oil paintings, graphics, sculpture and woodblock prints. He is recognised for combining both Western painting materials and methods with traditional and local Chinese and Taiwanese methods, motifs and themes.

It has been argued that Wu Hao's artistic career corresponds in a parallel manner to the development of Taiwan's political, social and cultural history. The artist has been instrumental in many prominent Taiwanese art movements, such as the Ton Fan art movement and the Nativist art movement. Much of contemporary Taiwanese art, including that of Wu Hao's, can be regarded as a hybrid of traditional and local Taiwanese motifs mixed with contemporary Western art. Wu is considered to be one of Taiwan's most influential and respected contemporary artists. Characteristically, the artist's work can be described as bright folk-art, which is vibrant, colourful and cheerful.

== Early life ==
Wu Hao was born in Nanking, China on 23 October 1932, and was educated at Suzhou Provincial Vocational High School. From a very early age Wu was interested in art and wanted to pursue a career in it. His grandfather was a Chinese brush painter and his mother an embroiderer. Wu's father disapproved of his son's creative urges and wanted him to pursue a career that could more readily support him. In 1949, at the age of 17, the artist migrated solo to Taiwan on the ship ‘New Health’ in order to flee the Civil War that was taking place in China. On this voyage were many intellectuals, artisans, students and wealthy citizens who were also escaping from the Civil War, which saw the Communist Party take control of the Middle Kingdom and its national forces. Between the late 1940s to the 1950s many conservative Chinese artists and radical modern painters moved to Taiwan. By doing so, they sought to promote freedom and protest against the communist regime, which was taking place in their home country.

== Military career ==
On arrival in Taipei Wu joined the Chinese Air Force as a junior officer. He was eventually promoted to a career officer and retired in 1971. In 1967 the Department of National Defence awarded Wu with a medal of exemplary conduct. Wu practiced art throughout the entirety of his military career.

== Artistic career ==
In 1950, as a young man in Taiwan, Wu attended an art school that was run by a group of renowned Chinese and Taiwanese artists such as Lee Chun-Sheng. At this time, Wu could not afford to attend the classes. However, Wu convinced the administrator to give him a job as a part-time assistant, which enabled him to take part in many of the art classes taught by Lee.

Lee Chun-Sheng, a well-known avant-garde artist and teacher, used his classrooms to promote and emphasise the importance of a variety of art movements in Taiwan. Art movements regarding freedom, liberation and national identity were particularly important to the teacher. Colleagues and students of Lee's often described him as the “propagandist in the coffee room.” Having studied European painting in Japan prior to World War II, alongside traditional Chinese painting, Lee became an influential figure in the Taiwan art scene. Together with many others, Lee rebelled against traditionalists who criticised the modernist movement and aimed to reunite traditional Chinese and Taiwanese painting with Western art trends and modern abstractions. Lee was an influential person throughout Wu's artistic career. This is particularly evident when viewing Wu's earlier and later westernised abstract oil paintings, inspired by the Western Surrealist art movement. Whilst Wu Hao studied under the guidance of Lee Chun-Sheng, he began to enter his works into many art exhibitions, such as the Ministry of National Defence Annual Art Exhibition, and frequently won awards.

During the 1950s, art materials were scarce and difficult to obtain in Taiwan. Wu, who at the time was living in poverty, resorted to using flower sacks as canvases to produce abstract oil paintings. In the course of 1956, in conjunction with numerous other Chinese and Taiwanese artists, such as Chen Tao-Ming and Hsiao Ming-Hsien, Wu established the Tong Fan, a Taiwanese abstract painting group and art movement that explored Western styles of art, who have been credited for producing the first abstract paintings in the history of Chinese and Taiwanese art. In 1957, a Tong Fan exhibition was held in Spain, drawing global attention to the movement.

Throughout the 1960s, international communities had great influence on the art scene in Taiwan. Western art schools were institutionalised and taught a variety of styles including Abstractionalism, New-Objectitivism, Neoclassicism, Cubism, Surrealism, Expressionism, Structuralism, Fauvism, Symbolism, Pop Art, Minimalism, Optical Art, and so on. This brought about a revival of the Taiwanese Nativist art movement, in which Wu was extremely influential. In 1964, Wu joined the Modern Print Society and began to produce woodblock prints. The artist temporarily abandoned oil painting, as he believed that woodblock printing was a more successful method for capturing the Orient's qualities, characteristics and identity. The movement is thought to have emerged in 1949, and was typified by a deliberate rejection of Western art techniques that were initially introduced to Taiwan by the Japanese throughout their colonial rule. Furthermore, the movement aimed to portray indigenous Taiwanese cultural forms and their relationship to the Taiwanese social, economic, cultural and political identity. Wu employed Nativism in his artwork to exert and explore national Taiwanese characteristics, particularly throughout the 1960s and 1970s when the movement was fruitfully revitalised. An example of this can be seen in Wu's 1967 woodblock print entitled Playing Music (annex 1).

Wu's prints, for which he is best known, are often characterised by their bright and vibrant colouring and traditional Taiwanese folk like style. Often, Wu would print images depicting scenes of daily activities in the Taiwan countryside, a common theme for many Taiwanese artists of the time. Wu's change to woodblock printing came at a time when Taiwan was becoming increasingly modernised and industrialised. Furthermore, a middle class was emerging with enough money to afford art, which changed the art scene in Taiwan.

The artist returned to oil painting in 1978. During this time, Wu worked on developing both his technique and form. Wu revolutionised his work by creating oil paintings which appeared similar to that of a woodblock print. Wu produced an extensive body of work thematically based on blooming flowers in his new style, often depicted alongside fruit. The artist used the symbol of a blooming flower (and occasionally ripe fruit) as a representation of contemporary Taiwan. Wu describes his blooming flowers as being cultivated and from soils of sorrows, reflecting Taiwan's difficult political and social past. The prospering flowers in this body of work symbolises how strong Taiwan's identity, culture and heritage is in the contemporary era today. Flowers, (annex 2) painted in 1990, is an example of such a work.

In 1987 Wu became chairman of the Chinese Modern Graphic Society and founded the Lee Chung-Sheng Modern Painting Education Foundation to commemorate the work of his influential past teacher.

== Death ==
Wu died on 29 March 2019, at the age of 86.

== Exhibitions ==
By the late 1950s through to the 1960s and 70s Wu's artworks were included in local and foreign exhibitions around the globe. In 1956, the artist participated in the National Calligraphy and Painting Exhibition of Taiwan. During 1971, the artist had work exhibited in the International Contemporary Graphic Exhibition that travelled between Rome and Milan. Shortly after, in 1972, Wu's work was once again exhibited in Milan, this time as a part of the Mostra International De Xilografia Exhibition. 1973 saw the artist's work included in the Chinese Artists Exhibition, which was held in Washington DC. During 2006, the Metaphysical Art Gallery, located in Taipei, curated a solo exhibition for Wu Hao, entitled Blossoming: Wu Hao Oil Painting Exhibition. Works such as Eight Children and Kites (annex 3), painted in 2001, were displayed showing Wu's revolutionised style of combining the style of woodblock prints with oil painting.

== See also ==
- Taiwanese art

== Bibliography ==
- Arcadja. “Some Works of Wu Hao.” Accessed 24 April 2013. www.arcadja.com/auctions/en/hao_wu/artist/85412/.
- Bridegum, Kelly, Selections from John and Mary Lou Paxton Collection, (California: Navada Museum of Art, 2006).
- Chiung-Jui, Hsiao, “From Innovation to Avant-Garde: 1950–1970 Taiwanese Art Development.” PhD. Diss., Institute of History and Language, National Cheng Kung University, N.D.
- Chung-Wen, Hsuan. 2002. “Gallery Show Highlights Painter, Printer Wu Hao.” Taiwan Today. Accessed: 22 April 2013. www.taiwantoday.tw/ct.asp?xitem=19219&ctnode=103.
- Fang, Chung-Yu, Contemporary Art in Taiwan after 1987: On the Evolution of Four Cultural and Artistic Tendencies, (Saarbrücken: Lap Lambert Academic Publishing, 2010).
- Lai, Ming-Yan, Nativism and Modernity, (Albany: State University of New York Press, 2008) 233.
- Metaphysical Art Gallery. “Wu, Hao- Introduction.” Accessed 23 April. 2013 www.artmap.com.tw13-pics-tw/03-04wul-eng.htm.
- Ministry of Foreign Affairs: Republic of China (Taiwan). “Culture: Modern Era, Contemporary Era and Ink Painting.” Last modified 25 April 2013. www.taiwan.gov.tw/print.asp?xitem=17474&ctNode=1924&mp=999
