= K11 (Shanghai) =

Office and retail complex in Shanghai, China

- K11购物艺术中心
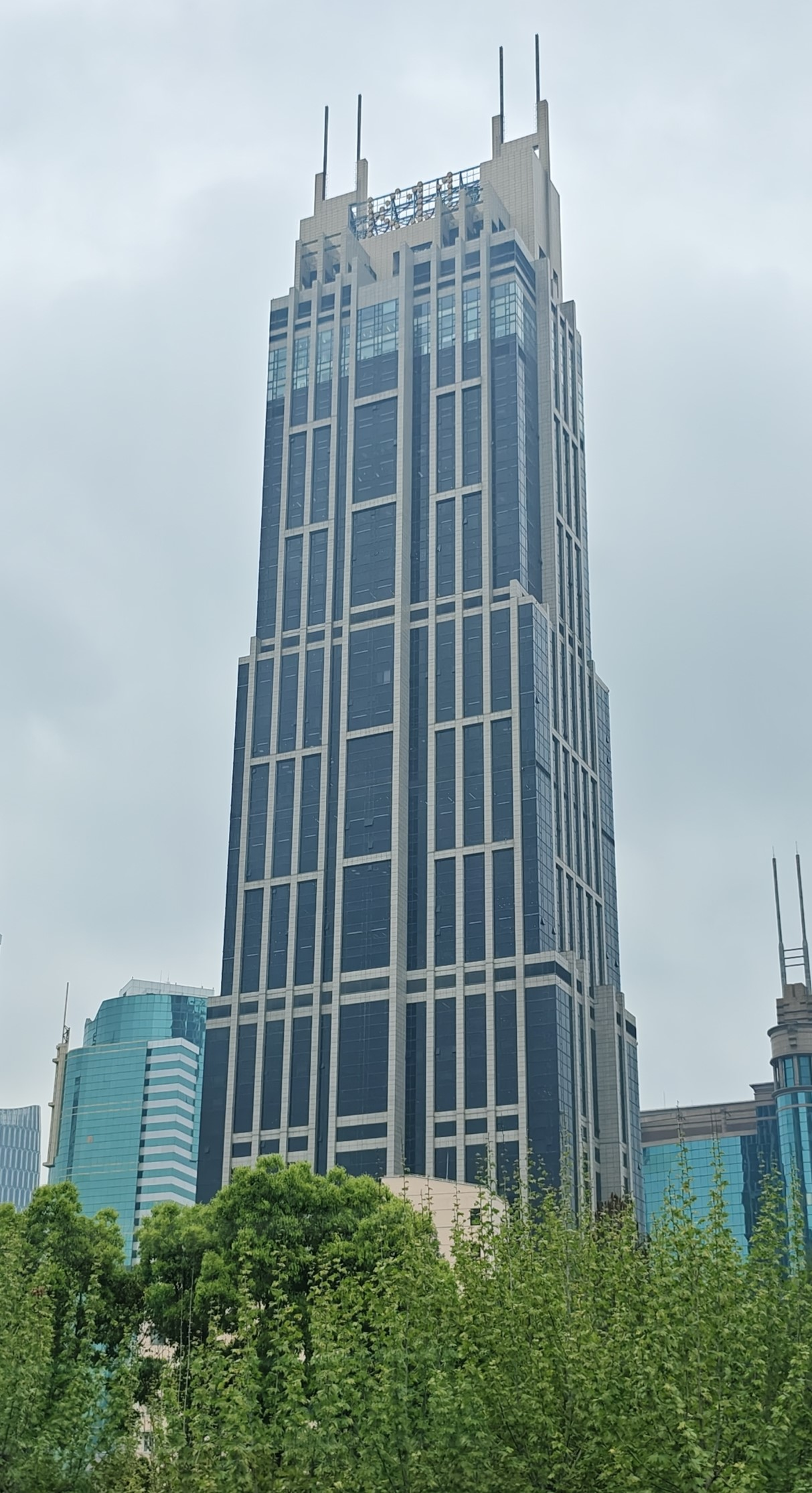
- K11 in 2026
- Interactive map of the K11 area

General information
- Type: Office, retail
- Location: Huangpu District, Shanghai, China
- Coordinates: 31.2255°N 121.4685°E
- Opening: 28 May 2013; 12 years ago

Height
- Architectural: 278.3 m (913 ft)
- Tip: 278.3 m (913 ft)
- Observatory: 210.6 m (691 ft)

Technical details
- Floor count: 59
- Lifts/elevators: 21

Design and construction
- Architect: Bregman + Hamann Architects
- Developer: New World Development

K11 (Chinese: K11购物艺术中心; pinyin: K11 Gòuwù Yìshù Zhōngxīn, also known as K11 Art Mall) is a shopping mall, located on Huaihai Lu of the Xintiandi district, in the former Luwan District of Shanghai, China. It is 278.3 metres (913 feet) high and was designed by Bregman and Hamann Architects. The mall consists of six stories above ground, and three underground, with a total area of about 40,000 m^{2}. It overlooks the People's Square across the Yan'an Elevated Road. Formerly called the Hong Kong New World Tower (Chinese: 香港新世界大厦; pinyin: Xiāngxǎng Xīn Shìjiè Dàshà), the building was reopened on May 28, 2013, as K11.

== Background ==
In light of the burgeoning Chinese cultural art movement, K11 was designed as a union between retail and art. This retail art center in Shanghai was opened by the K11 Art Foundation, led by founder Hong Kong billionaire Adrian Cheng. The first K11 Art Mall was opened in Hong Kong in 2009, four years before the opening of K11 Shanghai. K11 Shanghai is part of an initiative to create a "K11 art ecosystem" across all of China's major cities, such as Wuhan and Guangzhou. Cheng envisions K11 as a space for "art for the masses"; when asked about his vision for the K11 ecosystem, Cheng answered, "We want to create something that can propagate culture domestically and also internationally. We want to showcase the creativity of China."

== See also ==
- K11 (Hong Kong)
- K11 Art Foundation
- List of tallest buildings in Shanghai
