= Prenetics =

Company in Hong Kong, China

Prenetics Global Limited
- Type: Public
- Traded as: Nasdaq: PRE
- ISIN: KYG722451229
- Industry: Consumer Health; Health and Wellness; Genetic Testing; DNA Sequencing
- Founded: 2014
- Founders: Danny Yeung; Lawrence Tzang
- Headquarters: Hong Kong; United States
- Key people: Danny Yeung (CEO)
- Website: prenetics.com

Prenetics (NASDAQ:PRE) is a health sciences company headquartered in Hong Kong, with a presence in the United States. It focuses on early detection, prevention, and treatment of diseases, particularly cancer.

Its subsidiary brands include CircleDNA, Insighta and IM8.

== Company ==
One of the company's major investors was Alibaba founder Jack Ma.

After listing, it struggled to turn a profit. In October 2023 it announced a 1 for 15 reverse stock split so it could regain the stock exchange's required US$1 per share stock price.

Prenetics became the first Hong Kong based unicorn to list on Nasdaq following a merger with a Special-purpose acquisition company Artisan Acquisition Corp.

== Products and brands ==
Subsidiary CircleDNA focuses on disease prevention rather than genealogy, launching a rapid DNA-based colon cancer screening product in 2016. In 2019 it launched a line of at-home tests to be sold through retailers in Asia.

In 2023, Prenetics announced a $200 million joint venture with the Chinese University of Hong Kong and molecular biologist Dennis Lo to launch DNA testing for several major diseases and cancers: a project called Insighta. The early detection cancer test, Presight, was expected to begin clinical trials in 2024., although as of 2025 no clinical trials have been announced.

In 2024, Prenetics partnered with investor David Beckham to form a new wellness brand, IM8. In 2026, Prenetics announced that podcast host and author Jay Shetty would be the global ambassador.

== COVID-19 ==
Prenetics was one of three companies selected to provide testing support to the Hong Kong government.

The company's UK operation provided COVID-19 testing to the Premier League to help them restart football amid the pandemic. As part of so-called "project restart" the company hired former FIFA player Rio Ferdinand to reassure players about the safety of the plan. Around the same time, the company also launched pop-up testing sites.
