= K11 Art Mall =

Shopping centre in Tsim Sha Tsui, Hong Kong

Coordinates: 22.2977°N 114.1737°E

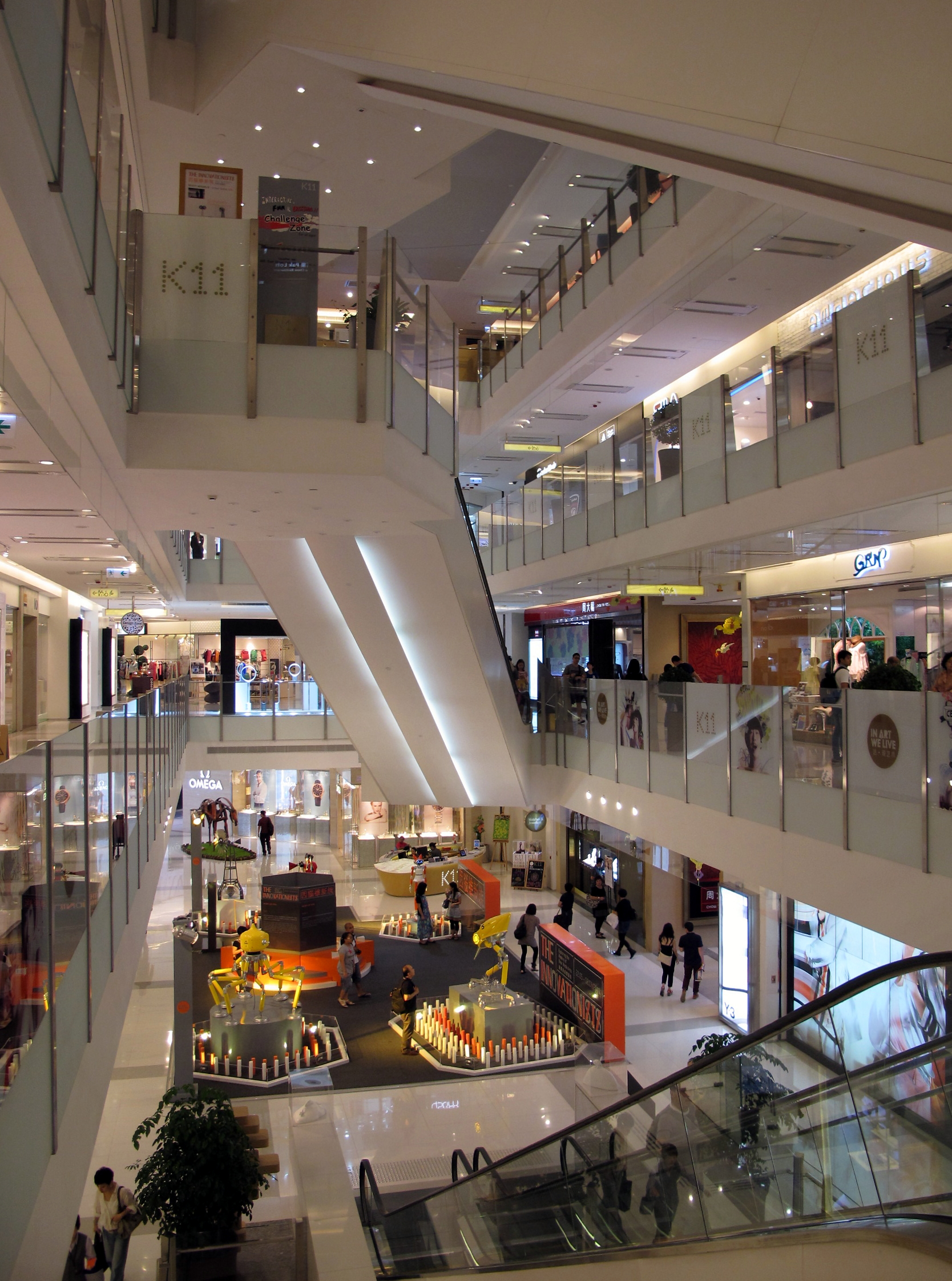
- Interior of the K11 Mall
- Interactive map of the K11 Art Mall area

General information
- Location: 18 Hanoi Road, Tsim Sha Tsui, Kowloon, Hong Kong
- Construction started: 2005; 21 years ago
- Completed: 2009; 17 years ago
- Inaugurated: 27 November 2009; 16 years ago
- Client: New World Development

Technical details
- Structural system: Reinforced concrete

Design and construction
- Architects: Dennis Lau & Ng Chun Man Architects & Engineers (Hong Kong) Limited
- Structural engineer: Structural: Ove Arup & Partners Hong Kong Limited; Electrical: Meinhardt (M&E) Limited

Other information
- Public transit: MTR Tsuen Wan line: Tsim Sha Tsui station Exit D3; MTR Tuen Ma line: East Tsim Sha Tsui station Exit N3, N4

Website
- http://hk.k11.com/

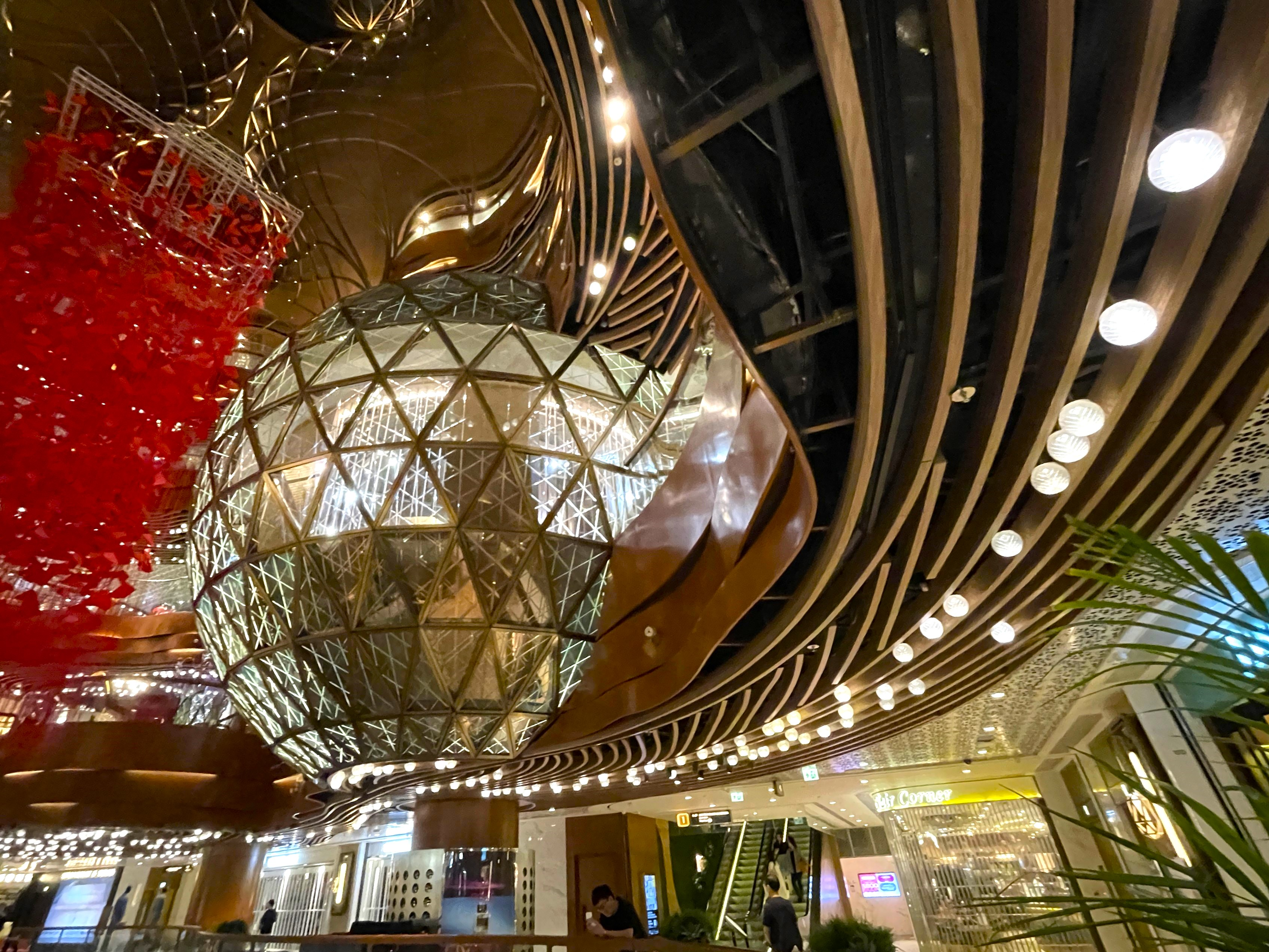
Interior atrium design in K11 MUSEA

K11 Art Mall is a seven-storey shopping centre in Tsim Sha Tsui, Hong Kong located in The Masterpiece, developed by New World Development and completed in December 2009. It is near Tsim Sha Tsui and East Tsim Sha Tsui stations.

== Layout ==
The K11 Art Mall has seven storeys (two underground, five above ground). The B1 and B2 storeys were opened on 27 November 2009, and the rest of the mall was opened on 5 December that year. Retail and restaurants accounted for 80 per cent and 20 per cent of the stores, respectively.

B2 is mainly international cuisine, women's fashion, shoes and cosmetics, with shops such as D-mop zone, Mousse, ISCOV, JILL SCOTT, Mirabell, and Milan. B1 is mainly daily necessities, including La Creation de Gute bakery, LensCrafters, AV Life, Dymocks bookstore, I Love Kitchen, Mannings, and Market Place by Jasons supermarket.

The ground floor has many high-end stores, including Longchamp, Tiffany by Soloman, Thann, the Italian brand Dormeuil, Y-3, D-mop, and Chow Tai Fook concept store. In the centre is a large plaza, called "The Piazza", that features a glass ceiling and a large LED screen.

Levels 1–3 have many boutiques, including AIGLE, KLASSE14, Laosmiddle, Levi's, Clarks, Fila, and mademoiselle. The mall also caters to Mainland customers, with several Mainland brand-name specialty stores such as Biba and imaroon.

There are restaurants on each floor of the mall, totaling over 20, including B2's Miso Cool and DALAT Vietnamese restaurant; The Piazza's Espressamente illy and awfully chocolate; and various others, such as AKU Japanese Restaurant, Al Pasha, Cool Gelato, Ginza Bairin and Pak Loh Chiu Chow Restaurant.

== History ==
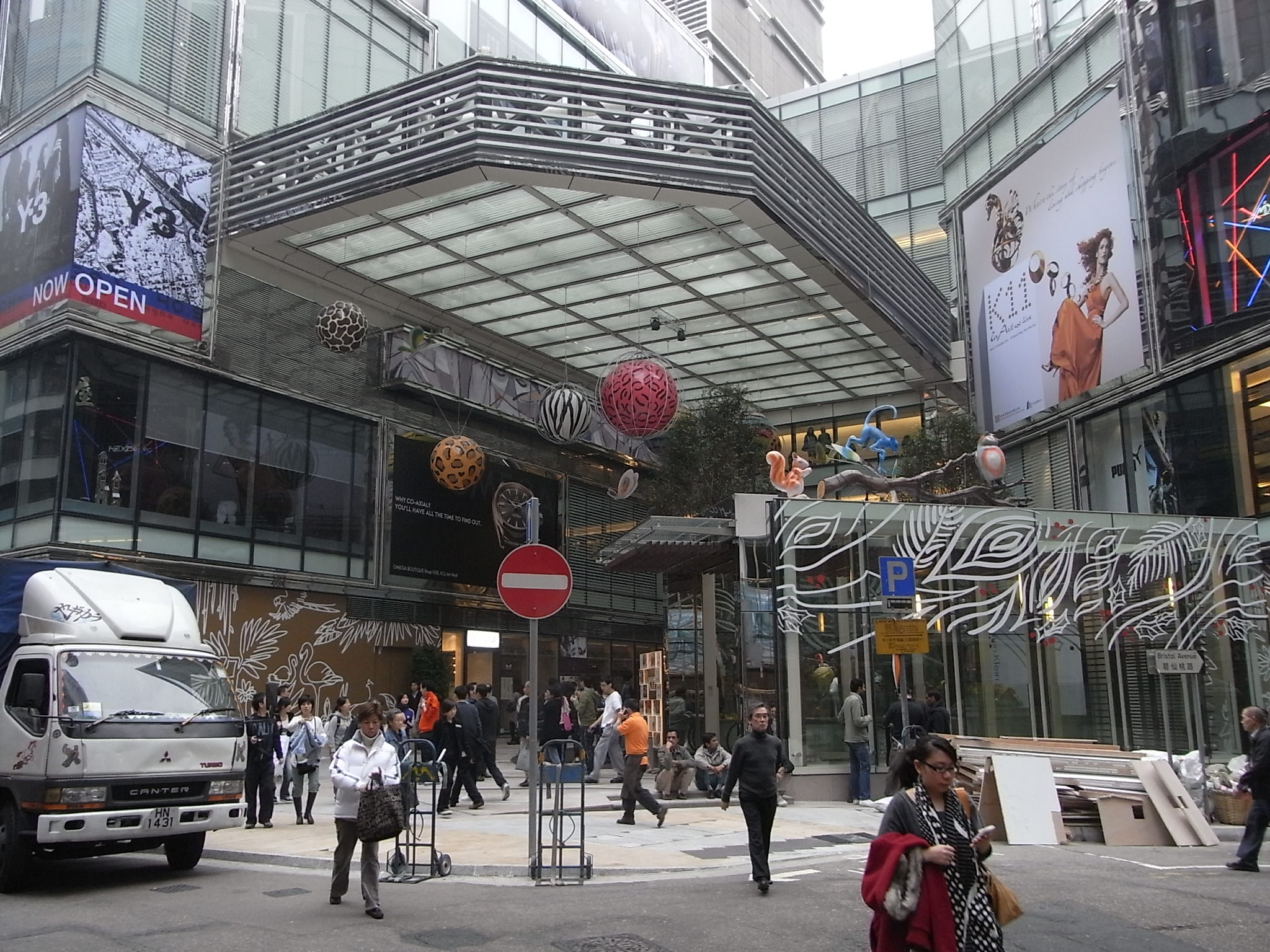
Entrance to K11 Art Mall (Carnarvon Road) where Cornwall Avenue used to be.

Cornwall Avenue (康和里) was a small street that once existed in Tsim Sha Tsui, Hong Kong. Due to the Hanoi Road redevelopment plan of the Land Development Corporation (now the Urban Renewal Authority), the Lands Department permanently closed down Cornwall Avenue and three other lanes nearby. It is now part of the mall.

In the second half of 1975, the Hong Kong government made an attempt to redevelop Cornwall Avenue and Hanoi Road into leisure and shopping pedestrian areas. Vehicles were not allowed to enter the two streets. However, the implementation soon triggered some counter-effects. After shop owners in Cornwall Avenue complained that the number of customers dropped significantly because vehicles could not enter the area, and the logistics became difficult. In response, the government lifted the ban on tourist buses, but it did not help. The redevelopment plan was shelved on 31 December of that year.

In 1976, the Town Planning Board submitted a draft to the Executive Council, proposing to demolish dozens of old buildings on Cornwall Avenue, Hanoi Road, and Mody Road, and rebuild the precinct of the roads. By 1978, the then Hong Kong government's proposed urban design blueprint for Tsim Sha Tsui was to demolish 39 old buildings within the three roads plus Bristol Avenue (hereinafter referred to as the Four Roads) and rebuild them into a new commercial and residential area. Since the land leases of these lots would expire by the end of 1978, the government decided not to renew the leases with the owners. After several years of disputes and negotiations, in 1982, the government struck a deal with the owners, allowing them to form six companies to carry out their own plans of redevelopment. But, in 1985, these companies shelved their plans due to economic considerations of redevelopment costs. Consequently the government required these owners to pay back the land rents and interests to be paid since 1978.

In the early 2000s, the New World Development and Urban Renewal Authority (URA) put forth another proposal to redevelop the Four Roads. Of which, the Cornwall Avenue area would mainly be redeveloped into a green and recreational area, and the entire street area would be incorporated into K11. Soon after the redevelopment started, some nearby residents revealed that the government turn its back on its promise to preserve the old trees at Cornwall Avenue. The URA's response was that they have never promised not to cut down the old trees.

Notable places:

- Bar: Waltzing Matilda Inn
- Hotel: New Astor Hotel (新雅圖酒店), located at the junction of Carnarvon Road (加拿芬道) and Bristol Avenue (碧仙桃路)

== See also ==
- Victoria Dockside – home to K11 Musea, K11 Artus, and K11 Atelier
- K11 (Shanghai)
- K11 Art Foundation
- New World Development
