= Rosewood Hong Kong =

Luxury hotel in Kowloon peninsula, Hong Kong

- 香港瑰麗酒店
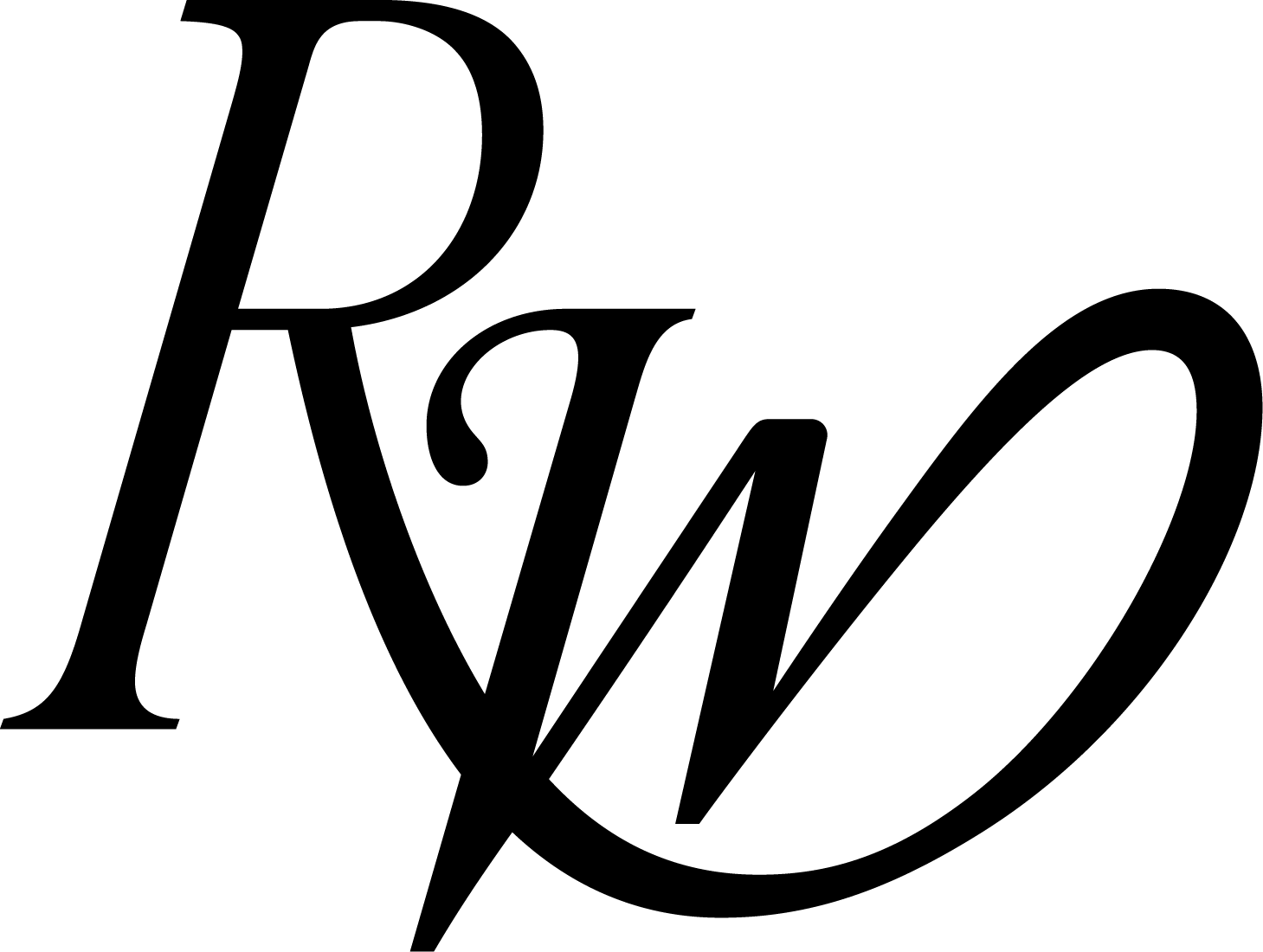

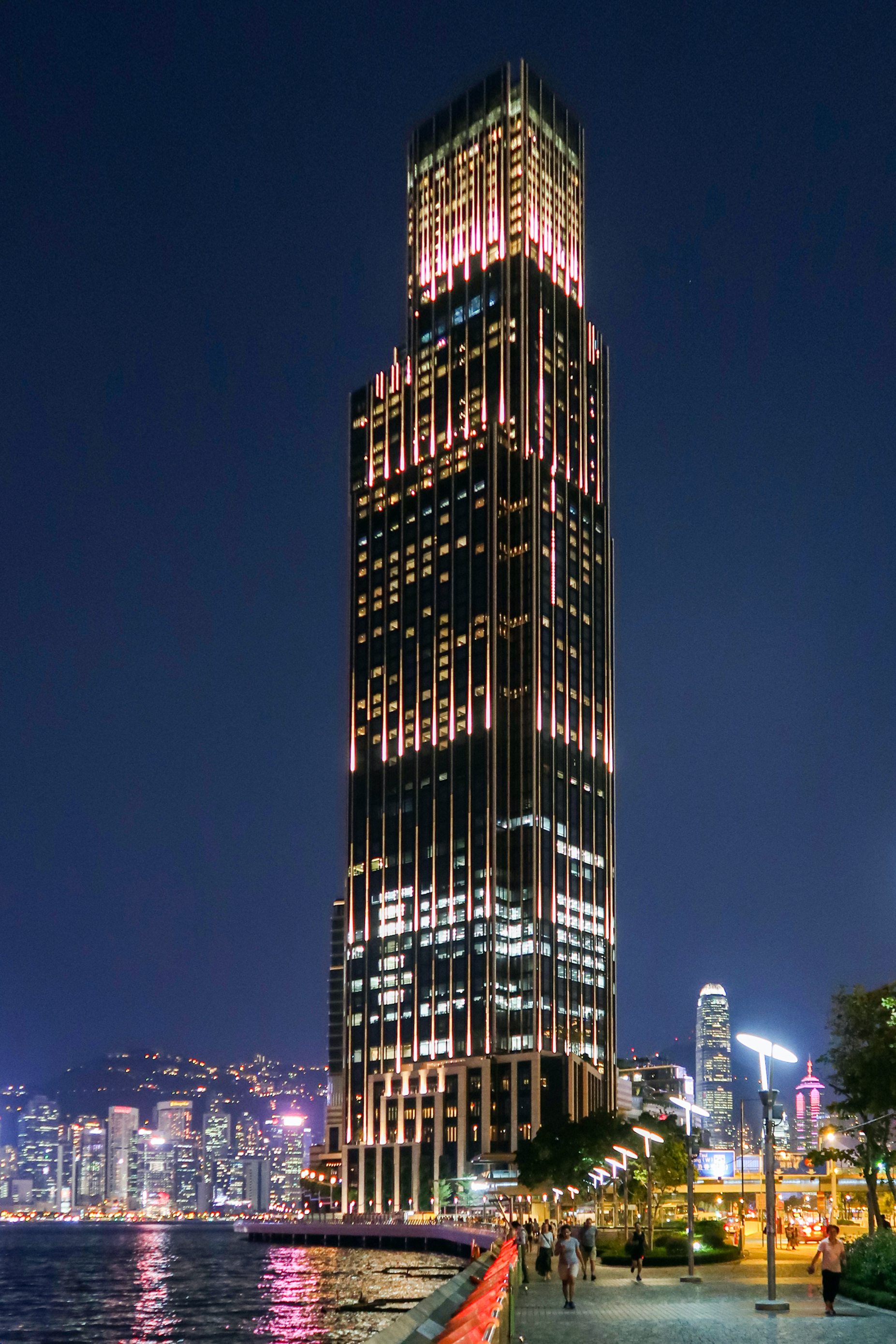
- Hong Kong Rosewood Hotel

- Location within Hong Kong urban core
- Hotel chain: Rosewood Hotels & Resorts

General information
- Location: Hong Kong, Victoria Dockside, 18 Salisbury Road, Tsim Sha Tsui
- Coordinates: 22°17′40.92″N 114°10′32.9″E
- Opening: 17 March 2019; 7 years ago
- Operator: Rosewood Hotel Group

Technical details
- Floor count: 43

Design and construction
- Architecture firm: Kohn Pedersen Fox

Other information
- Number of rooms: 413
- Number of restaurants: 11

Website
- www.rosewoodhotels.com/en/hong-kong

Chinese name
- Traditional Chinese: 香港瑰麗酒店
Transcriptions
Yue: Cantonese
- Yale Romanization: Hēung góng gwai laih jáu dim
- Jyutping: Hoeng^{2} gong^{2} gwai^{3} lai^{6} zau^{2} dim^{3}

Rosewood Hong Kong is a five-star luxury hotel located at the Victoria Dockside in Tsim Sha Tsui, Kowloon, Hong Kong. It is under the Rosewood Hotels & Resorts, a subsidiary of the Rosewood Hotel Group which is ultimately owned by New World Development.

In 2025, Rosewood Hong Kong ranked number 1 in the World's 50 Best Hotels list published by William Reed Ltd. In 2026, it repeated its position as number 1.

Rosewood Hong Kong has held 3 Michelin keys since 2025.

== History ==
Holt's Wharf was a godown terminal dating back to 1910. It was later acquired by New World Development to be developed into New World Centre. It was then replaced by Victoria Dockside which Rosewood Hong Kong is part of.

Rosewood Hong Kong opened on 17 March 2019 as the Hong Kong debut of Rosewood Hotels.

The 65-storey building was designed by Kohn Pedersen Fox and the hospitality design was done by Tony Chi.

== Penthouse ==
The hotel features a 12,000-square-foot penthouse named Harbour House. Located on the entire 57th floor of Victoria Dockside, it features two 13-meter and 8-meter outdoor private swimming pools, a lush garden, and stunning views of Victoria Harbour. A private elevator leads directly to the entrance of the Harbour House suite, which also includes lacquered cabinets, a private bar, a spacious living area, a study, a stylish dining room, a kitchen, and a guest dressing room. The Harbour House suite floor also features Garden Villa suites and a private gym equipped with state-of-the-art fitness equipment, offering a total of five separate bedrooms. Prices start from US$100,000 per night, making it the most expensive hotel suite in Hong Kong.

In October 2025, Rosewood Hong Kong came first in the World's 50 Best Hotels list by William Reed Ltd where it beat out the previous year's winner, Capella Bangkok. Prior to this, it had landed in the top three of the list twice.

== Gallery ==
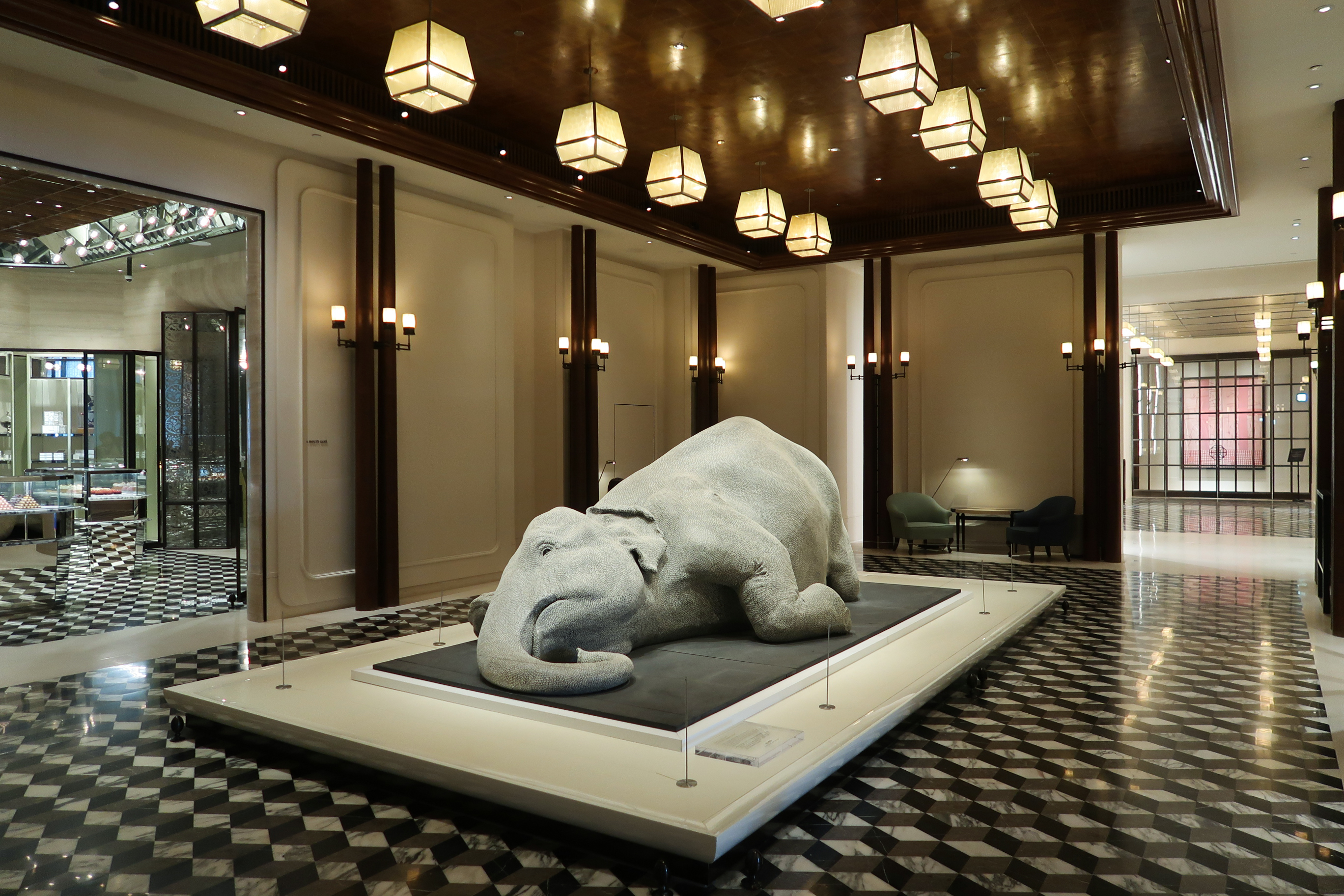
Lobby

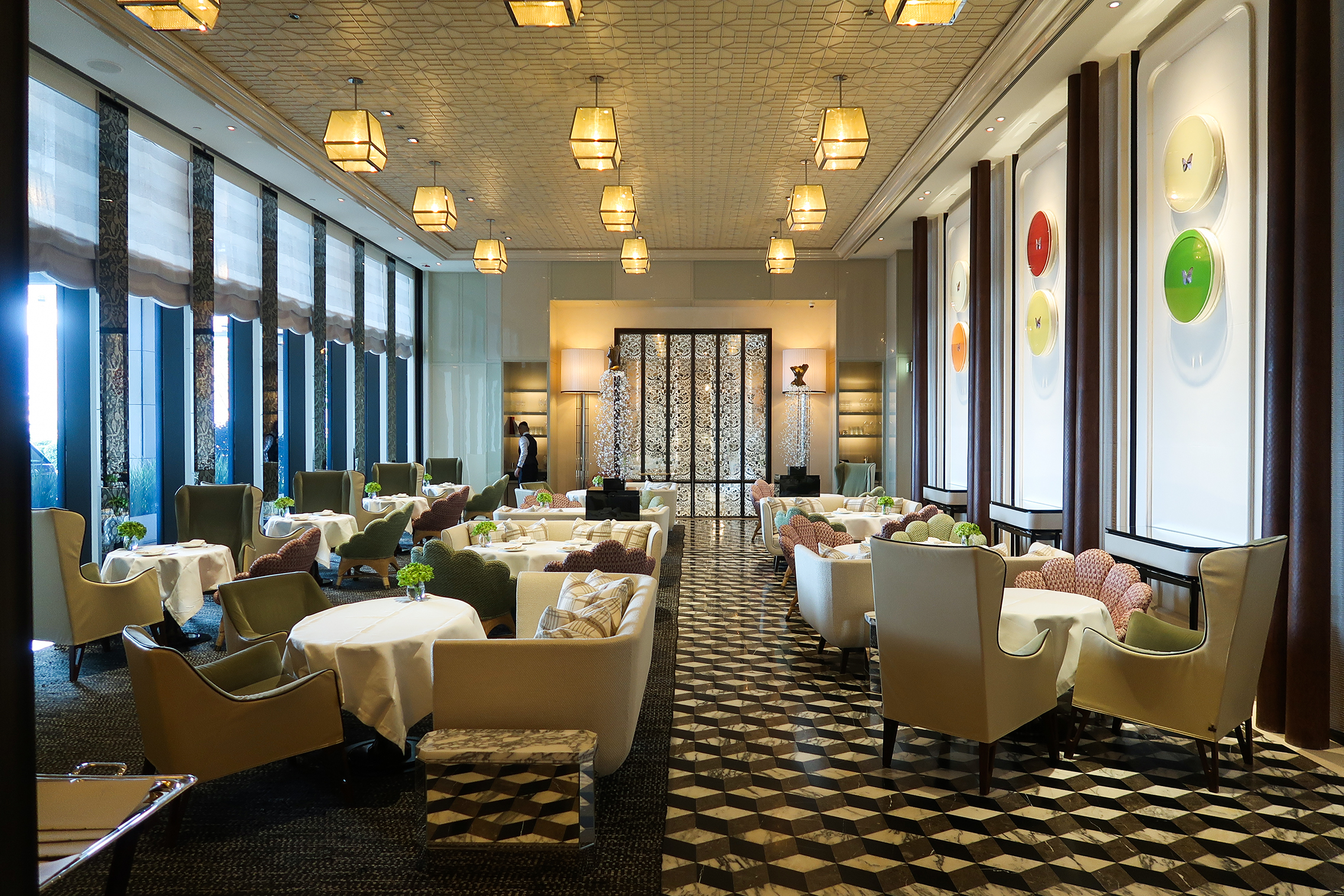
The Butterfly Room

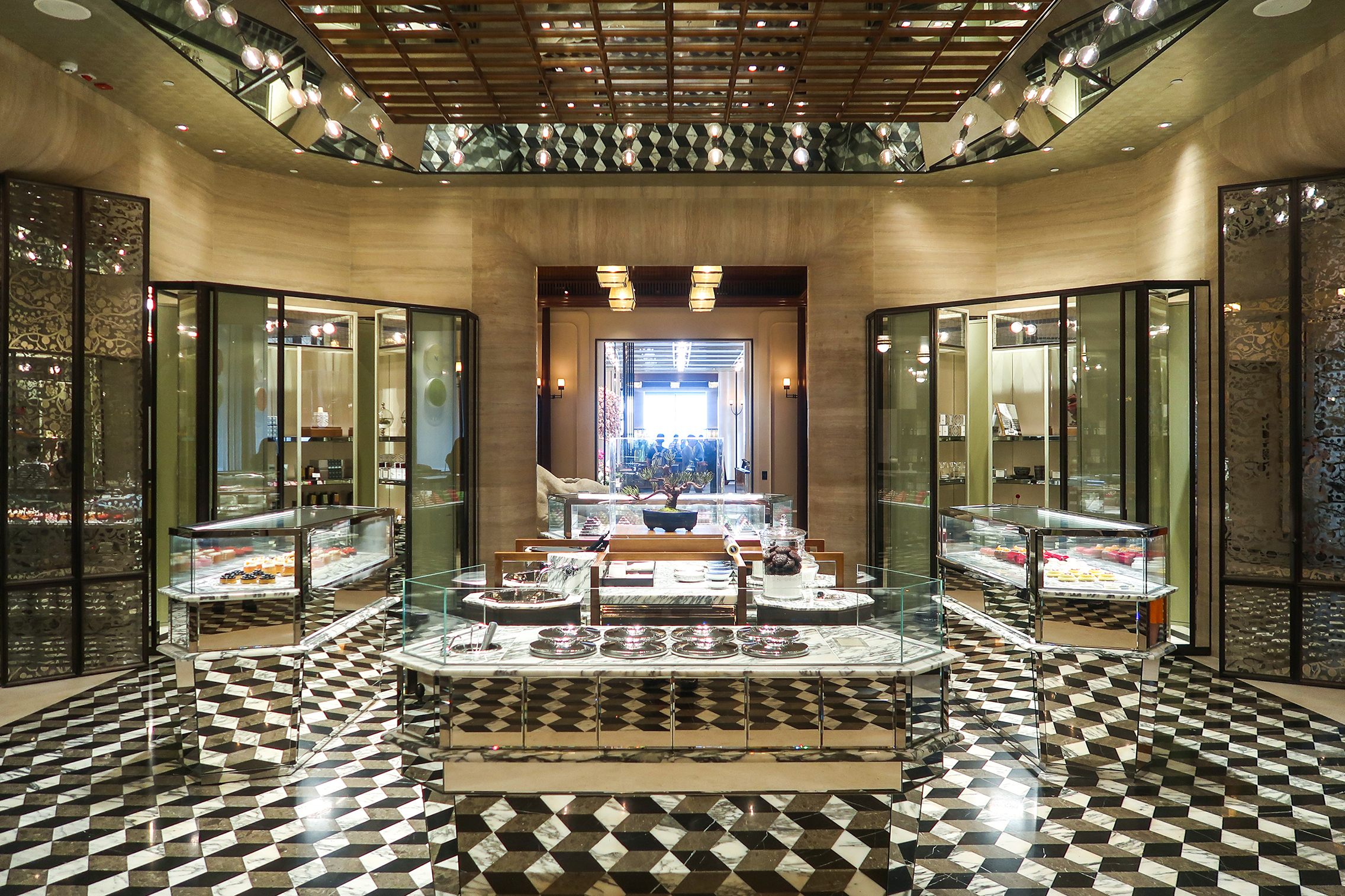
Butterfly Patisserie

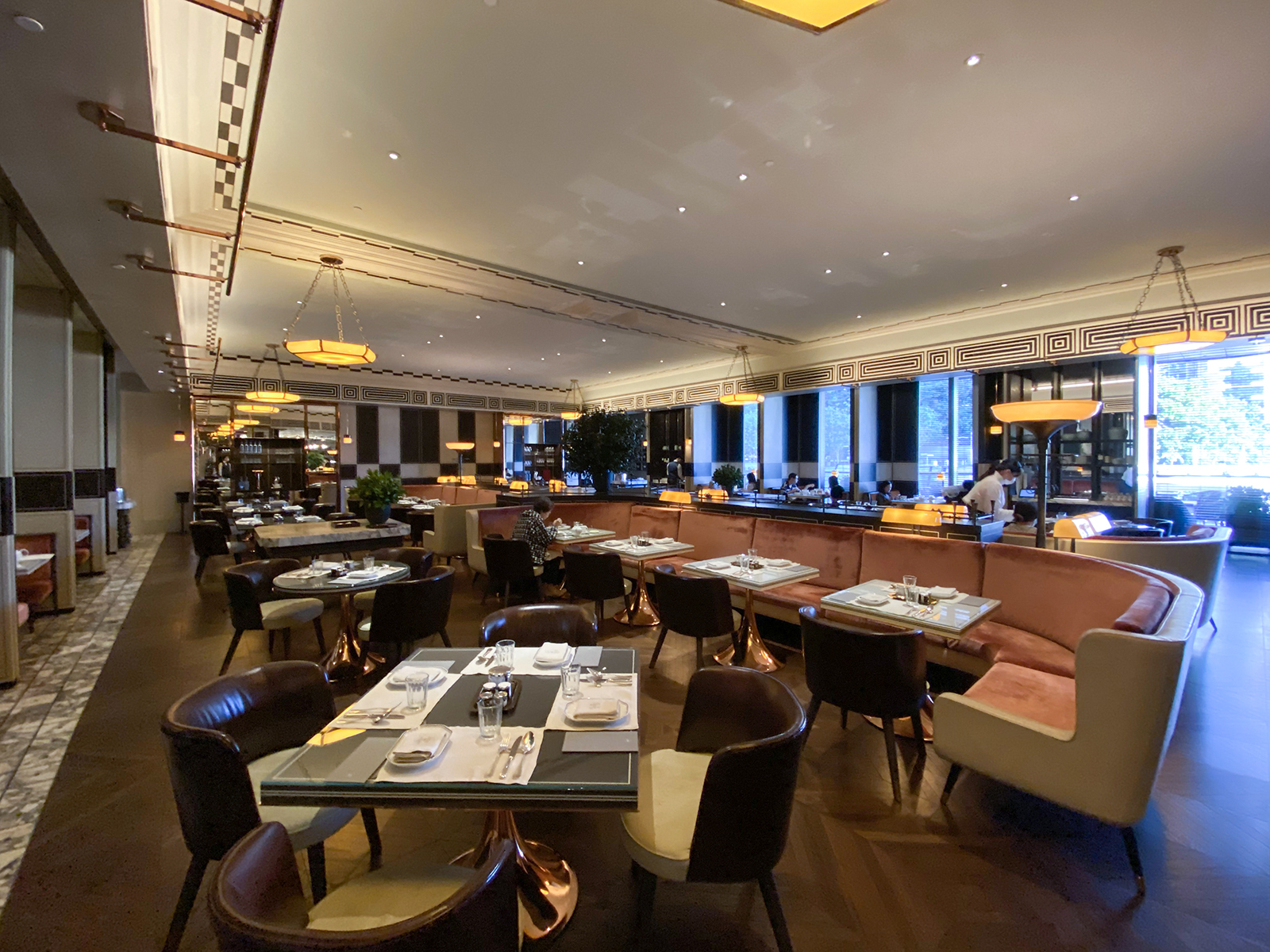
Holt's Café

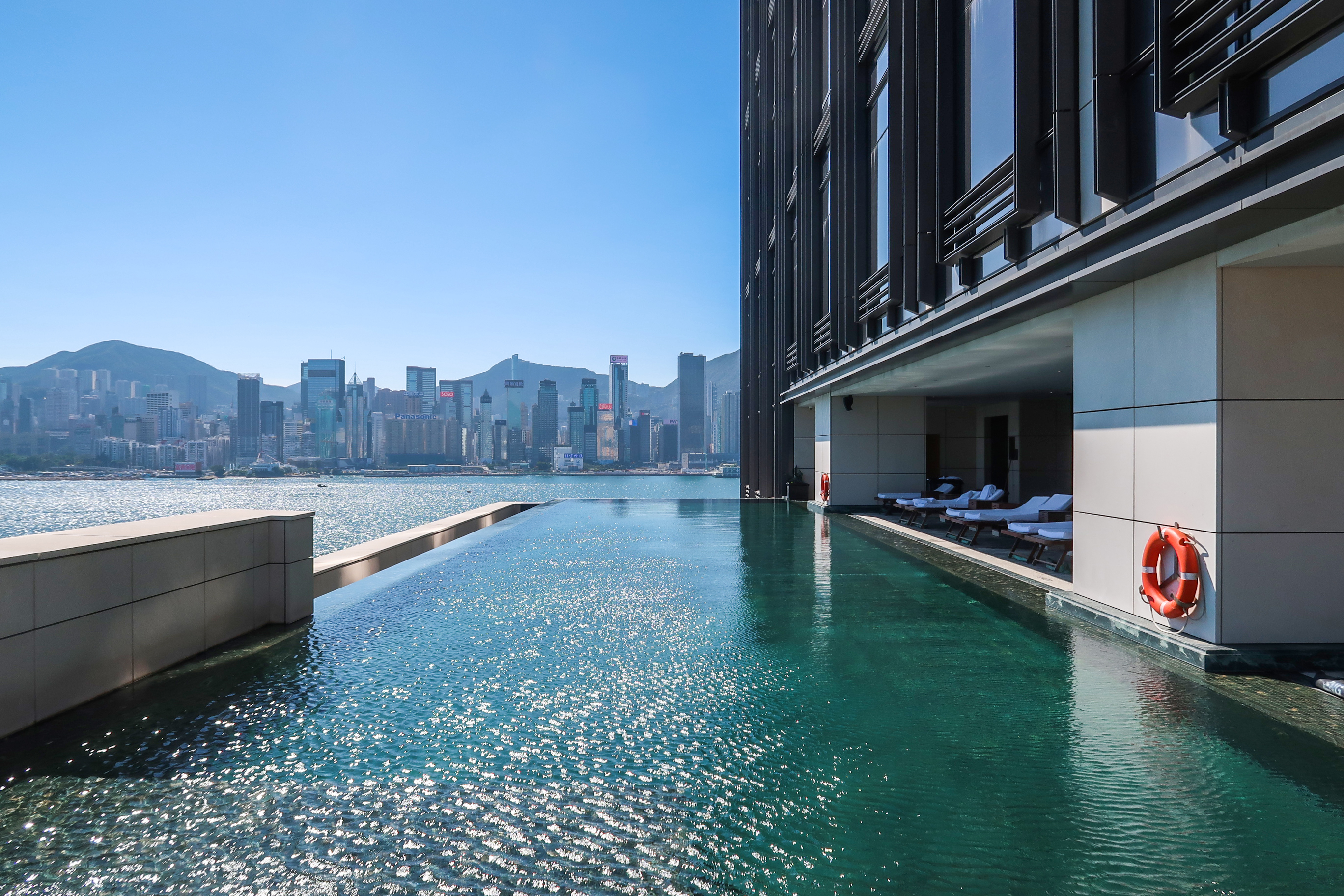
Infinity pool

== See also ==
- Victoria Dockside
- K11 Art Mall
- List of tallest buildings in Hong Kong
