= Tokyu Department Store =

Tokyu

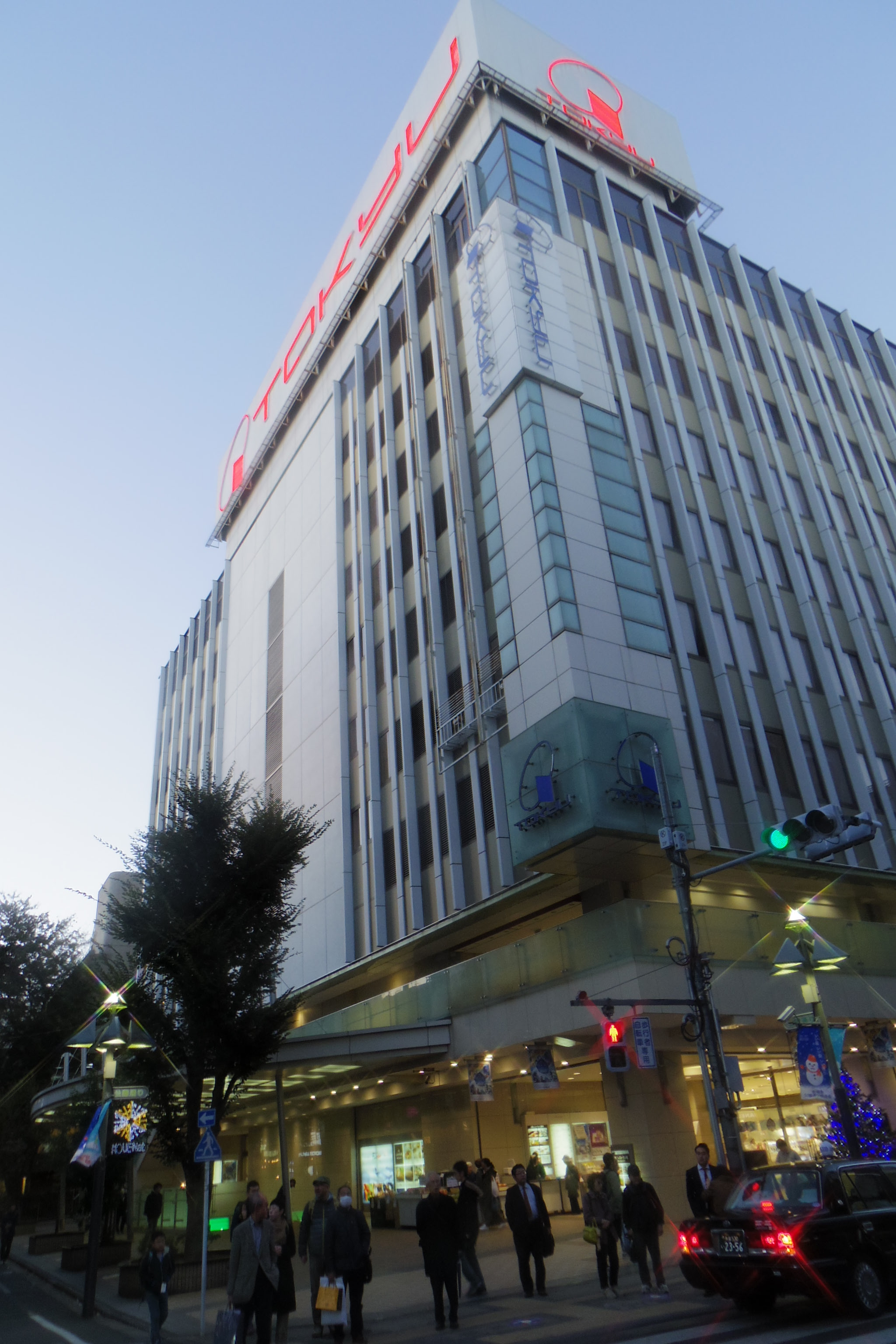
- Kichijoji store
- Native name: (東急百貨店, Tōkyū Hyakkaten)
- Number of locations: 3 (2023)
- Revenue: ▼JPY ¥330.8 Billion; (2021)
- Operating income: ▼JPY ¥1.2 Billion; (2021)
- Parent: Tokyu Corporation
- Website: tokyu-dept.co.jp

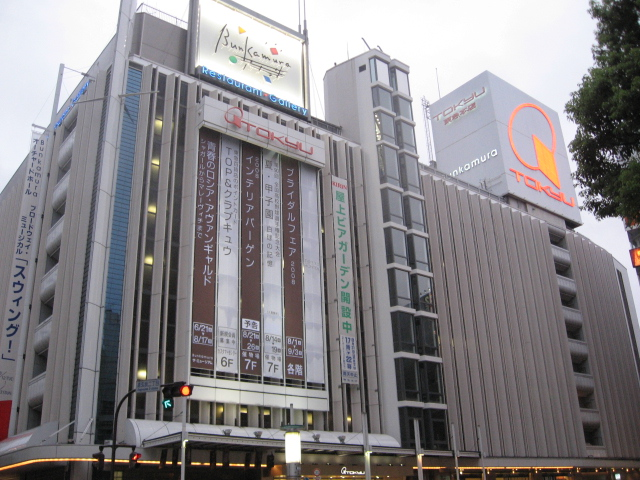
Shibuya flagship store

Tokyu Department Store (東急百貨店, Tōkyū Hyakkaten) is a Japanese department store chain owned by Tokyu Group.

== Stores ==
Tokyo

- Shibuya

- Hikarie ShinQs
- Shibuya Mark City

- Kichijōji
- Machida Tokyu Twins
- Setagaya Futakotamagawa Tokyu Food Show

Kanagawa Prefecture

- Yokohama

- Tama Plaza
- Hiyoshi Tokyu Avenue
- Aobadai Tokyu Square

- Kawasaki

- Nakahara Musashikosugi Tokyu Food Show Slice

Hokkaido

- Sapporo

== Former stores ==
=== Japan ===
Tokyo

- Shibuya Honten (flagship store; closed on 31 January 2023)
- Shibuya Toyoko (Shibuya Station; closed on 31 March 2020)
- Nihonbashi (closed in 1999; currently Coredo Nihonbashi)

Kanagawa Prefecture

- Yokohama

- Tsuzuki Kohoku Tokyu (closed in 2011)

Hokkaido

- Kitami (closed in 2007)

Nagano Prefecture

- Okaya (closed in 2002; currently ILF Plaza)

=== Outside Japan ===
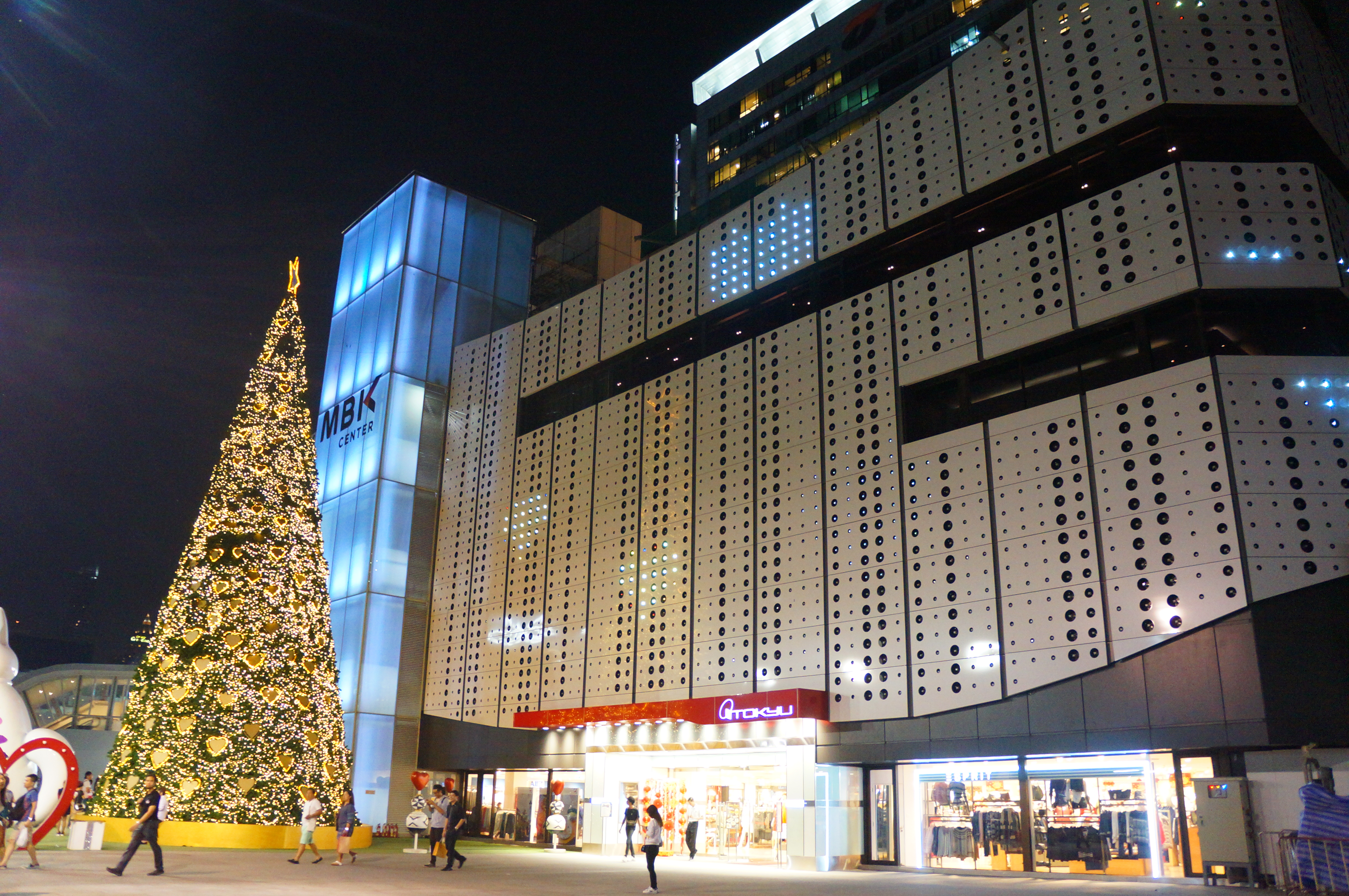
Bangkok Tokyu Department Store at MBK Center

==== Hong Kong ====
- Kowloon (New World Centre; closed in 1999; demolished in 2010 and replaced by Victoria Dockside)

==== Taiwan ====
- Taipei

- Daan (closed in 2002)

- Taichung

- Central (closed in 1996)

==== Singapore ====
- Marina Square (closed in 1993)

==== Thailand ====
- Bangkok

- MBK Center (closed in 2021)
- Paradise Park (closed in 2019)

== See also ==
- Shirokiya
