= Holt's Wharf =

Coordinates: 22.29328°N 114.17364°E

- Traditional Chinese: 藍煙囪貨倉碼頭
- Simplified Chinese: 蓝烟囱货仓码头
- Cantonese Yale: Làahm yīnchūng fochōng máhtàuh
- Literal meaning: 'Blue chimney wharf'
Transcriptions
Standard Mandarin
- Hanyu Pinyin: Lán yāncōng huòcāng mǎtóu
- Wade–Giles: Lan^{2} yen^{1}-ts‘ung^{1} huo^{4}-ts‘ang^{1} ma^{3}-t‘ou^{2}
- IPA: [lǎn jɛ́n.tsʰʊ́ŋ xwô.tsʰáŋ mà.tʰǒʊ]
Yue: Cantonese
- Yale Romanization: Làahm yīnchūng fochōng máhtàuh
- Jyutping: laam4 jin1 chung1 fo3 cong1 maa5 tau4
- IPA: [lam˩ jin˥.tsʰʊŋ˥ fɔ˧.tsʰɔŋ˥ ma˩˧.tʰɐw˩]

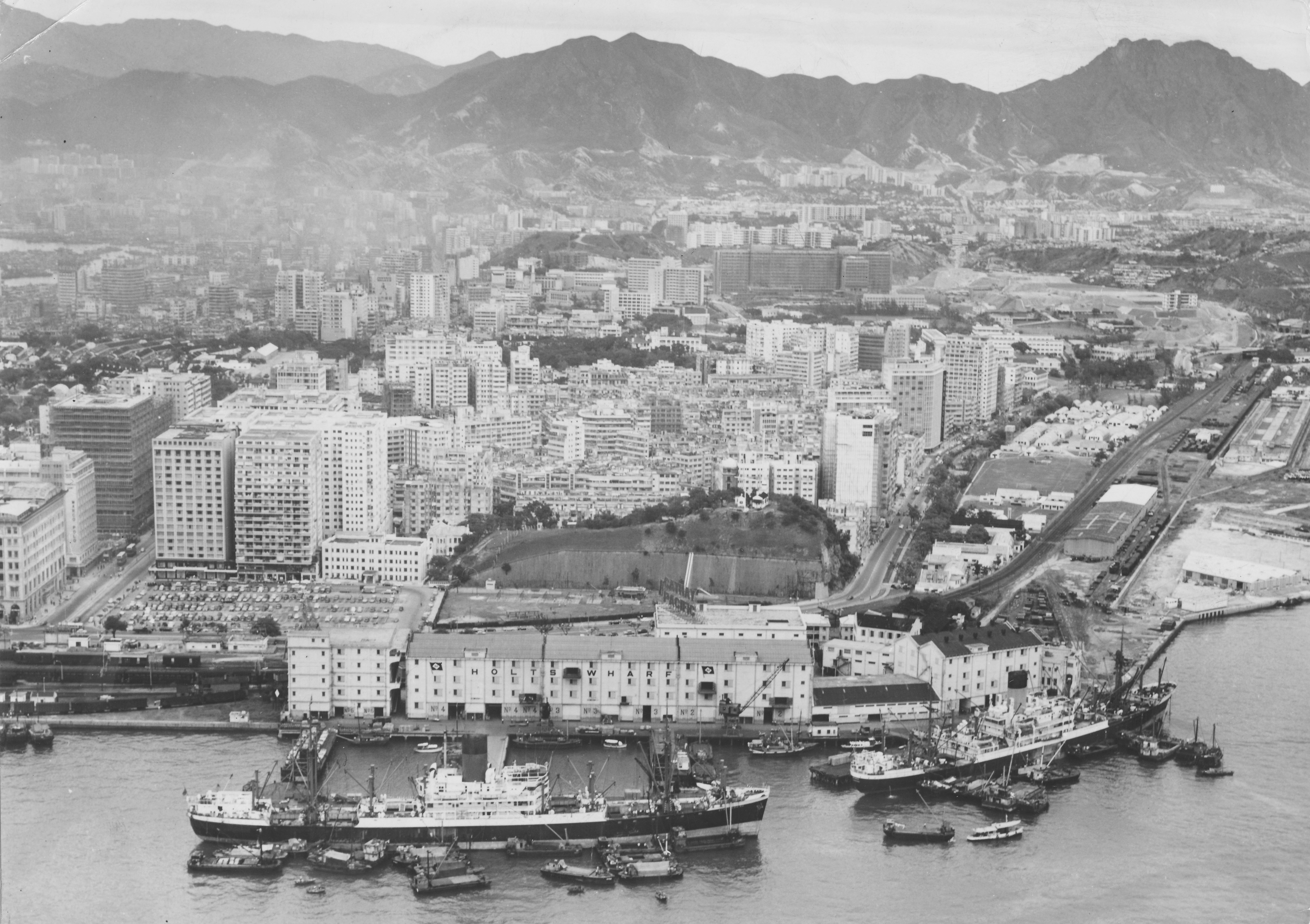
Aerial view of the Holt's Wharf in 1963

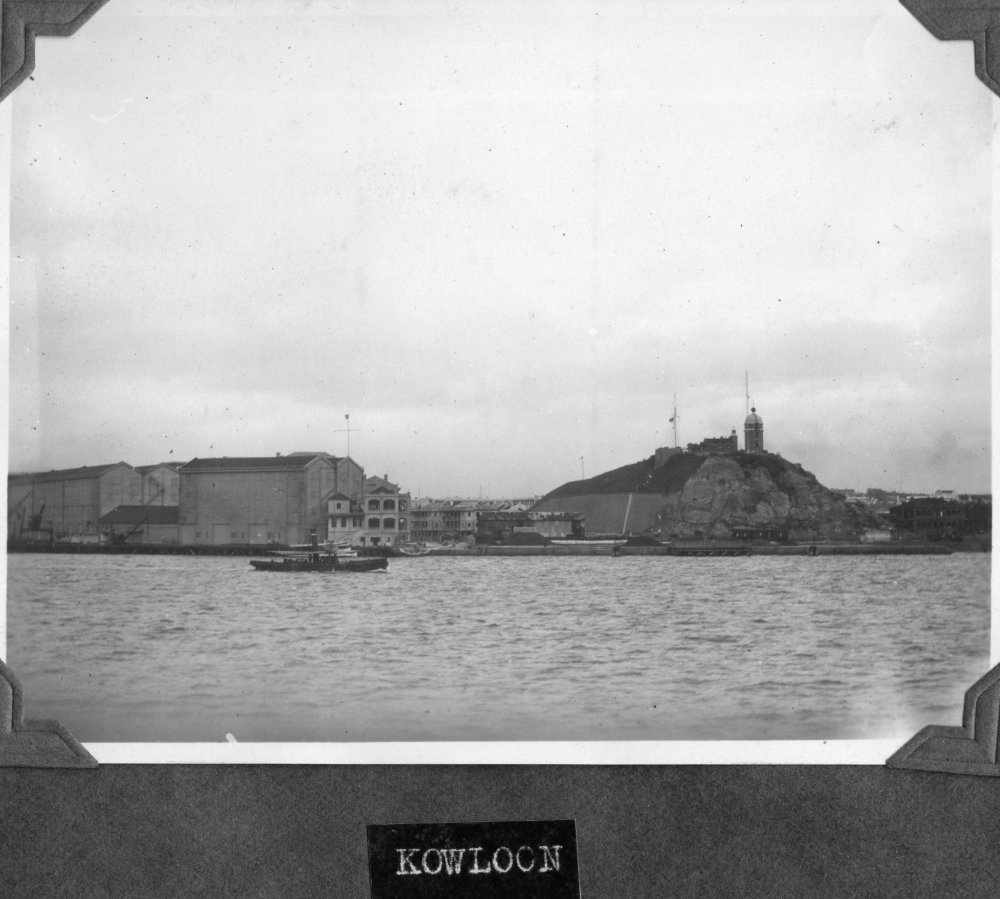
Historic view of Tsim Sha Tsui, with Holt's Wharf on the left and Blackhead Point and Signal Hill Tower on the right.

Holt's Wharf (Chinese: 藍煙囪貨倉碼頭; lit. 'Blue chimney wharf') was a godown terminal in Tsim Sha Tsui, Kowloon, Hong Kong, in the 20th century. It was set up in 1910 and jointly owned by British Swire Group and Blue Funnel Line. It was located at the southeast seaside of Tsim Sha Tsui and the south of Signal Hill. Since it was next to Tsim Sha Tsui KCR station, it acted as a railway and freight logistics hub in Hong Kong.

In 1971, Swire Group and Blue Funnel Line sold the site to New World Development. Two years later in 1973, New World Development commenced the construction of New World Centre and The Regent Hong Kong (renamed the InterContinental Hong Kong since 2001) on the site. Construction was completed in 1982. In 2017, the site was renamed to Victoria Dockside.
