= Victoria Dockside =

Property development in Hong Kong

Coordinates: 22°17′41.87″N 114°10′31.56″E

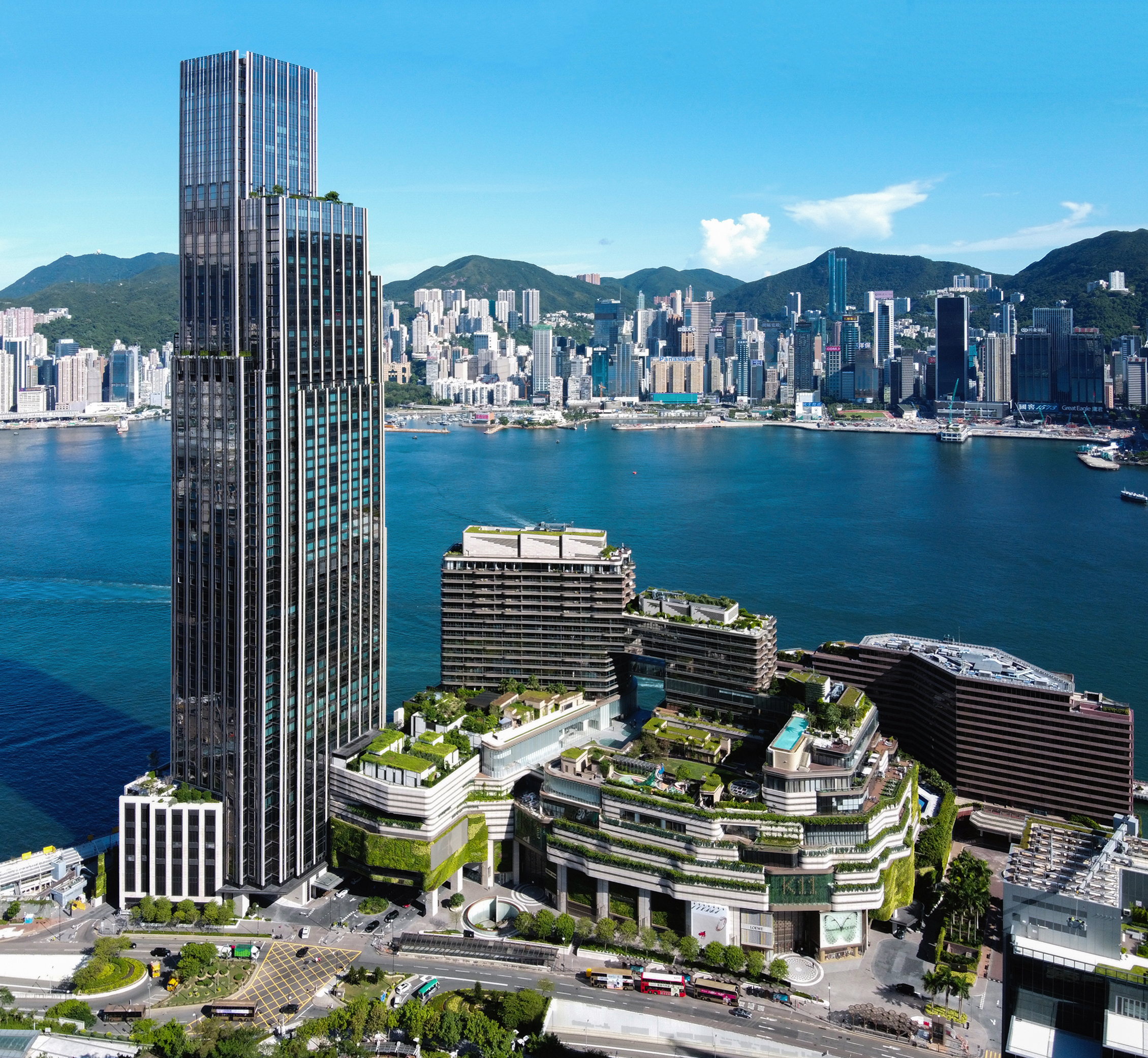
- View of Victoria Dockside that includes Rosewood Hong Kong (left)
- Interactive map of the Victoria Dockside area

General information
- Location: 18 Salisbury Road, Tsim Sha Tsui, Kowloon, Hong Kong
- Cost: US$2.6 billion
- Owner: New World Development

Height
- Height: 284 m (931.8 ft)

Design and construction
- Architects: KPF, James Corner Field Operation, Ronald Lu & Partners, LAAB Architects
- Developer: New World Development
- Structural engineer: Arup
- Services engineer: WSP

Other information
- Public transit: East Tsim Sha Tsui station (Exit J)

Website
- www.victoriadockside.com

Victoria Dockside is a property development on the waterfront of Tsim Sha Tsui, Hong Kong near East Tsim Sha Tsui station. The development opened in stages between 2018 and 2019 at a cost of US$2.6 billion. First founded in 1910, the site was originally known as Holt's Wharf.

The development includes K11 Musea, a shopping centre; serviced apartments, office space, and a hotel. The development is home to a 284-metre skyscraper designed by architectural firm Kohn Pedersen Fox; it is currently the 8th-tallest building in Hong Kong.

== Background and history ==
The site was developed in 1910 as Holt's Wharf. It first acted as a railway hub and was once considered one of the world's major ports. In 1971, the site was sold to New World Development, which developed the area during the 1970s commencing the construction of the New World Centre and the Regent Hong Kong (later renamed InterContinental Hong Kong).

The project was completed in 1982, and also included a shopping complex, residential, offices and apartments. The New World Centre was considered one of the largest commercial complexes in the world during this time. The site became popular amongst locals and tourists, and hosted numerous events including the LEGO International Exhibition and Hong Kong-Beijing Rally.

In 2010, New World Development closed the New World Centre for demolition. In 2012, it started the development of the Victoria Dockside, which was named after Victoria Harbour as well as the site's former name, "Holt's Wharf". The project was led by Adrian Cheng, and includes participation of over a hundred international and local architects and designers. The development was completed in 2019 and includes Rosewood Hotel and residences.

In 2021, the shopping centre K11 Musea temporarily closed due to the COVID-19 pandemic.

== Design and architecture ==
The building's site plan was designed by architectural firm Kohn Pedersen Fox (KPF), as well as architect James Corner Field Operations, Ronald Lu & Partners, LAAB Architects, and PLandscape.

== Components ==
=== K11 Musea (shopping centre) ===
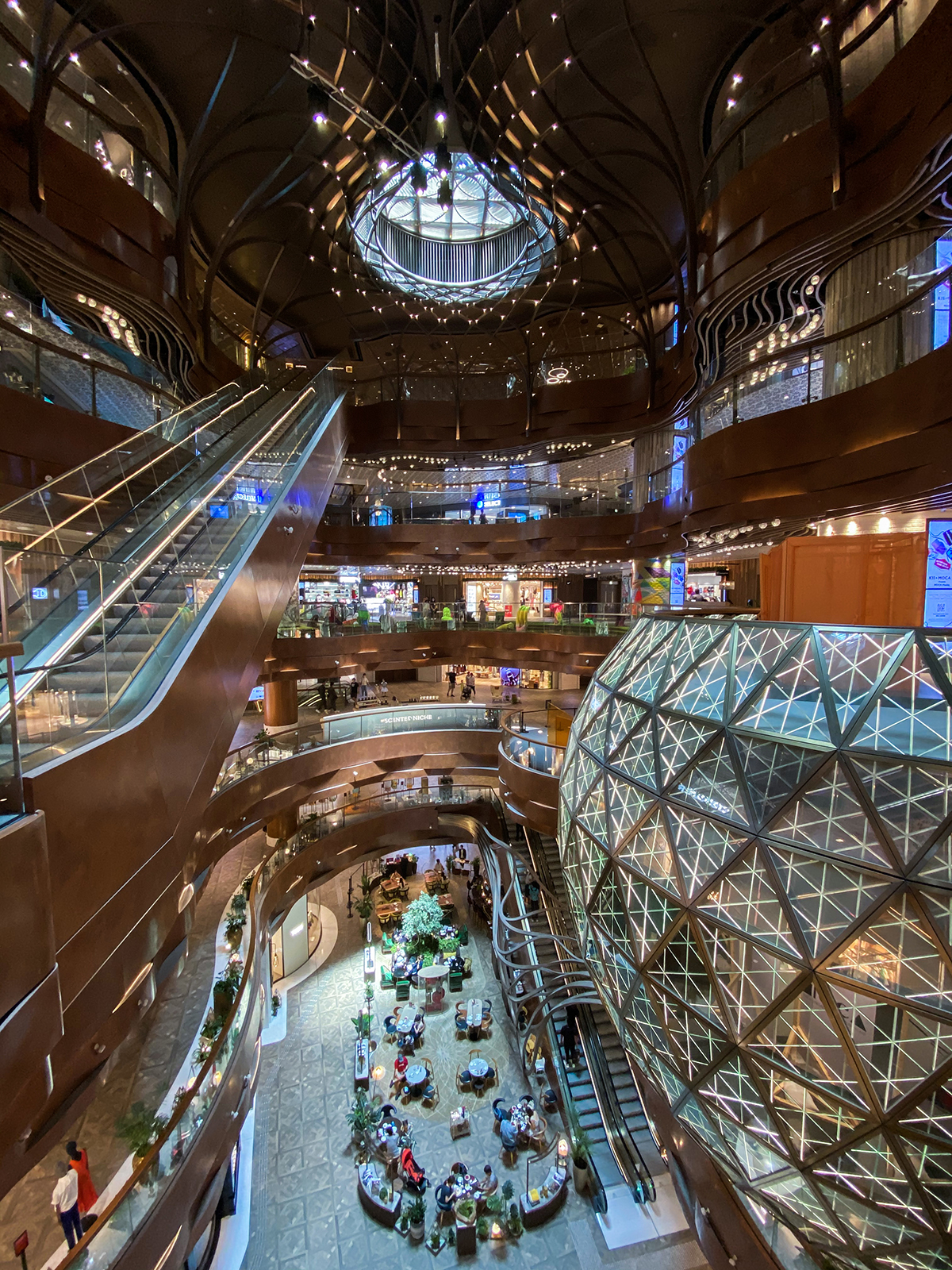
K11 MUSEA Opera Theatre

K11 Musea (styled in all capitals) is a retail complex located in the Tsim Sha Tsui promenade front within the Victoria Dockside development, Hong Kong. The project is developed by the K11 Group, part of New World Development, and opened in August 2019.

K11 Musea was conceived by the K11 Group and its founder Adrian Cheng. K11 Musea’s name is said to derive from “A Muse by the Sea”. The complex will include a public art collection and is set to be completed by 2019. The project aims to foment art, culture, and design in Hong Kong.

The K11 Musea building consists of ten floors and an outdoor plaza. The project's design architects include James Corner (James Corner Field Operations), Forth Bagley (Kohn Pedersen Fox), and LAAB Architects. The outdoor plaza is a 2,000 square-feet sunken plaza modelled as an amphitheater. The architecture also includes 50,000 square feet of green walls. The developer claims certifications of the U.S. LEED (gold standard) and the Hong Kong BEAM Plus (gold standard). There is further claim that the development will include rainwater harvesting and that interior parts of the building will be made in part of natural limestone and wood.

=== K11 Artus (serviced apartments) ===
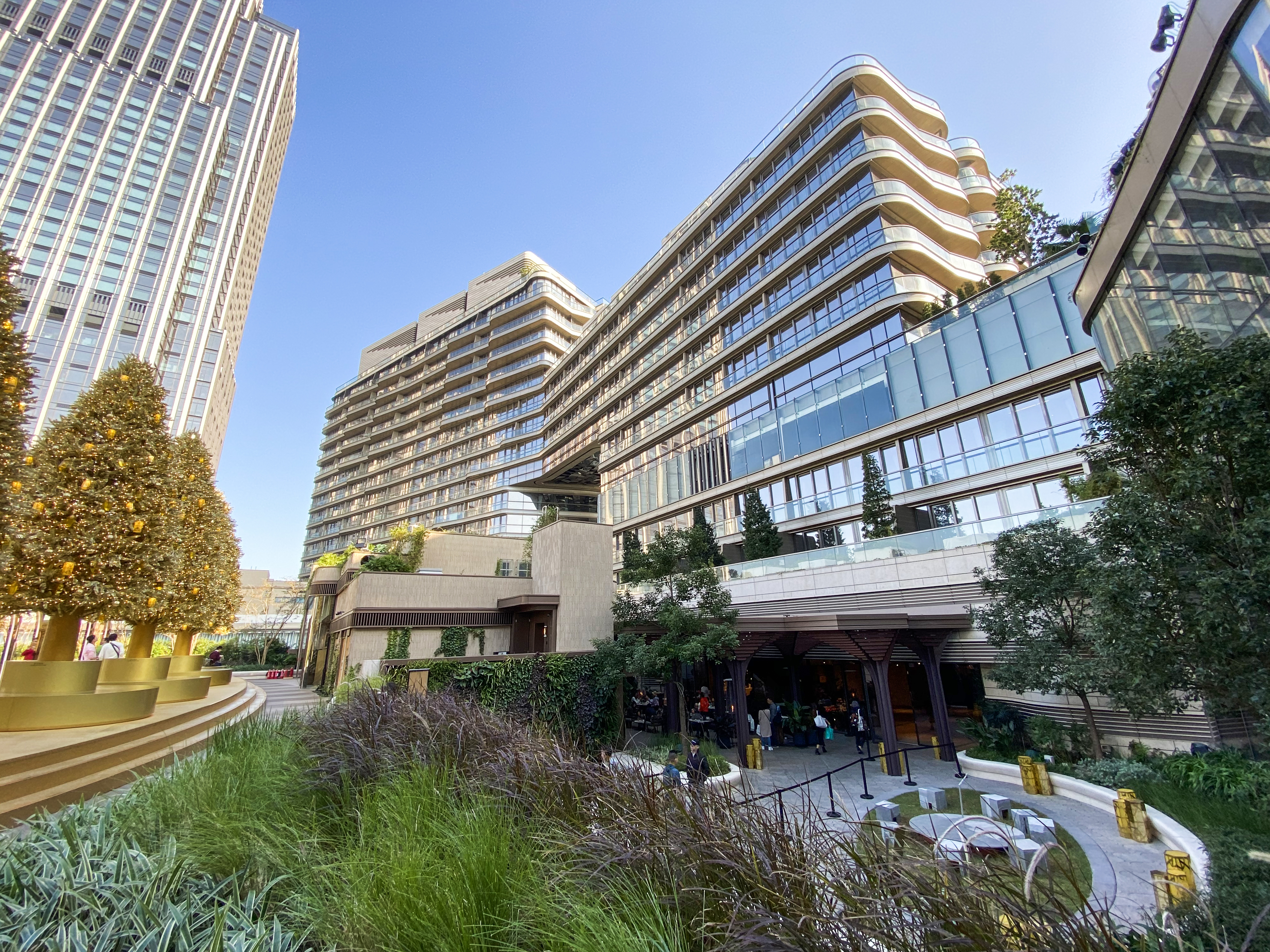
K11 ARTUS

K11 Artus is a residential area within Victoria Dockside, Hong Kong. It was inaugurated in 2019 as part of a US$2.6 billion development, and has engaged New York–based architectural studio Kohn Pedersen Fox to design the building and Hong Kong–based architectural firm AFSO for its interiors.

=== K11 Atelier (offices) ===
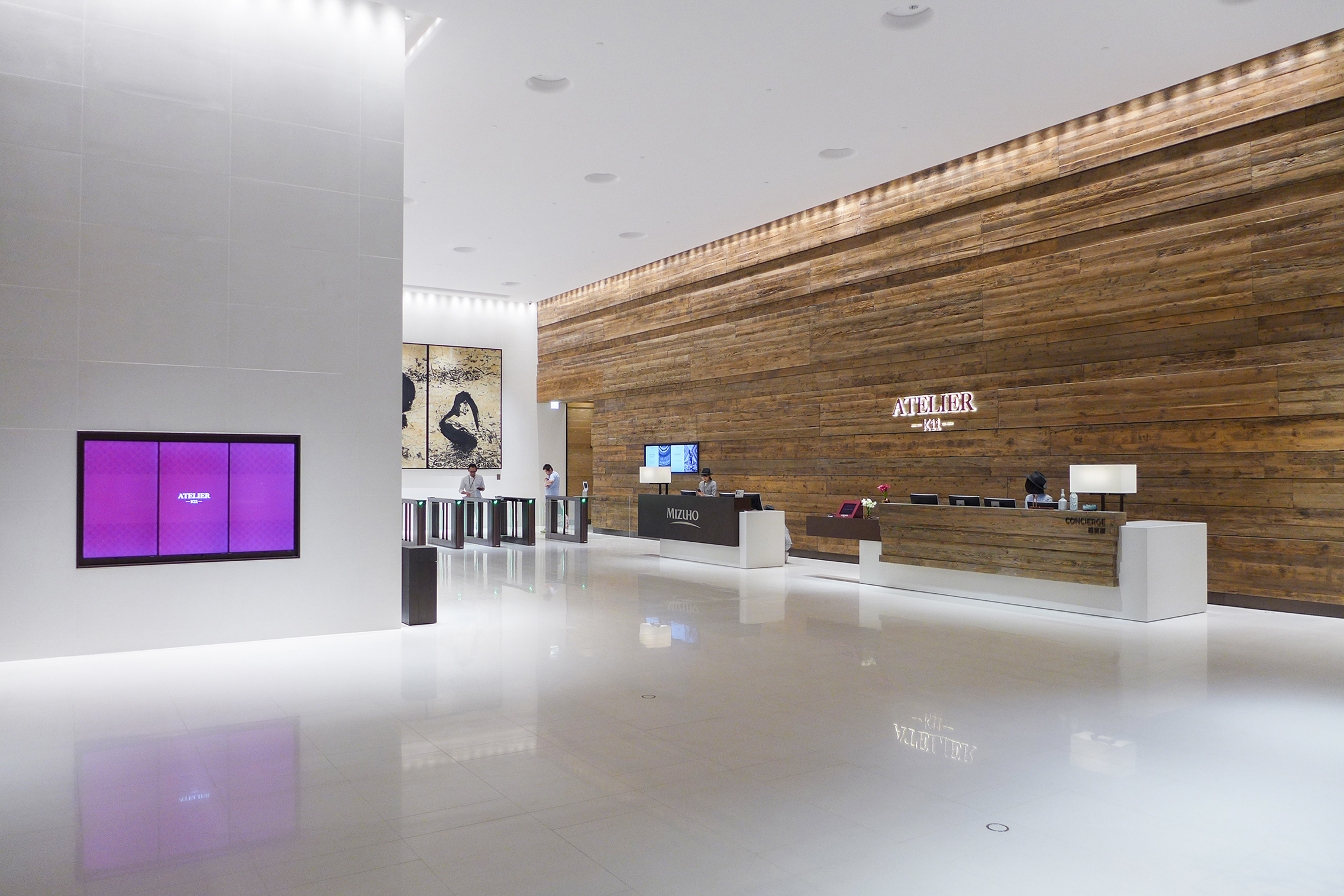
K11 ATELIER office lobby

The office component of the development, called K11 Atelier, comprises 15 storeys of the main tower.

The K11 Atelier was founded in 2017.

The building's interior was designed by Japanese Design Studio Simplicity. The building's main lobby includes a community space and a breakout area. The K11 Atelier comprises a total of 435,156 square feet and includes a 270-degree view of Victoria Harbor. It also holds two green building certifications (U.S. LEED Platinum pre-certification and the Hong Kong BEAM Plus provisional status). The façade of K11 Atelier is integrated with a photovoltaic solar system.

=== Rosewood Hong Kong ===
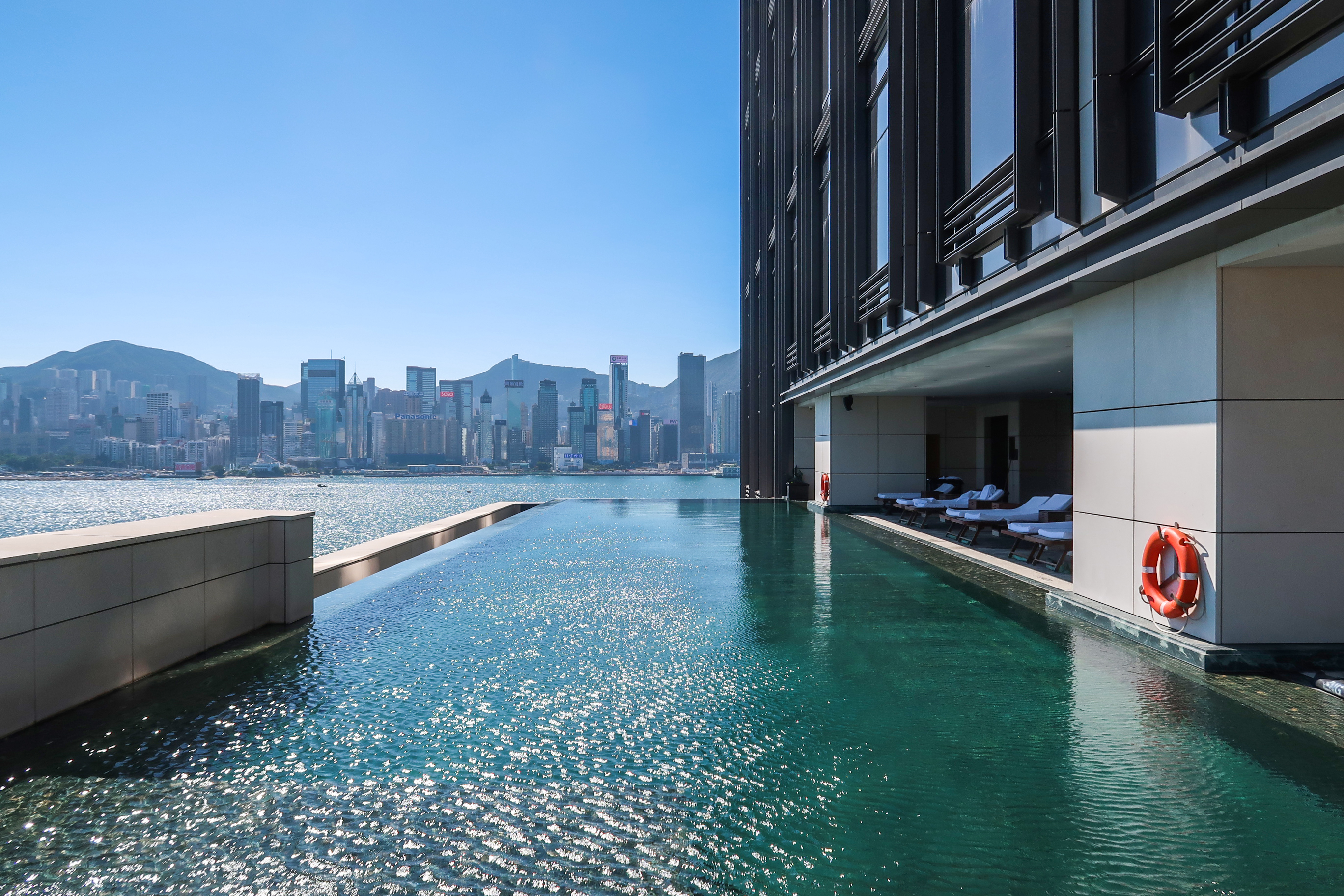
The infinity pool at the 6F of Rosewood Hong Kong

The Rosewood Hong Kong is an ultra luxury hotel at the Victoria Dockside in Kowloon peninsula, Hong Kong. In 2025, it was ranked first in The World's 50 Best Hotels list published by William Reed.

== See also ==
- K11 Art Mall
- List of tallest buildings in Hong Kong
