= Salisbury Road, Hong Kong =

Road in Tsim Sha Tsui, Hong Kong

Coordinates: 22.29497°N 114.17340°E

Salisbury Road
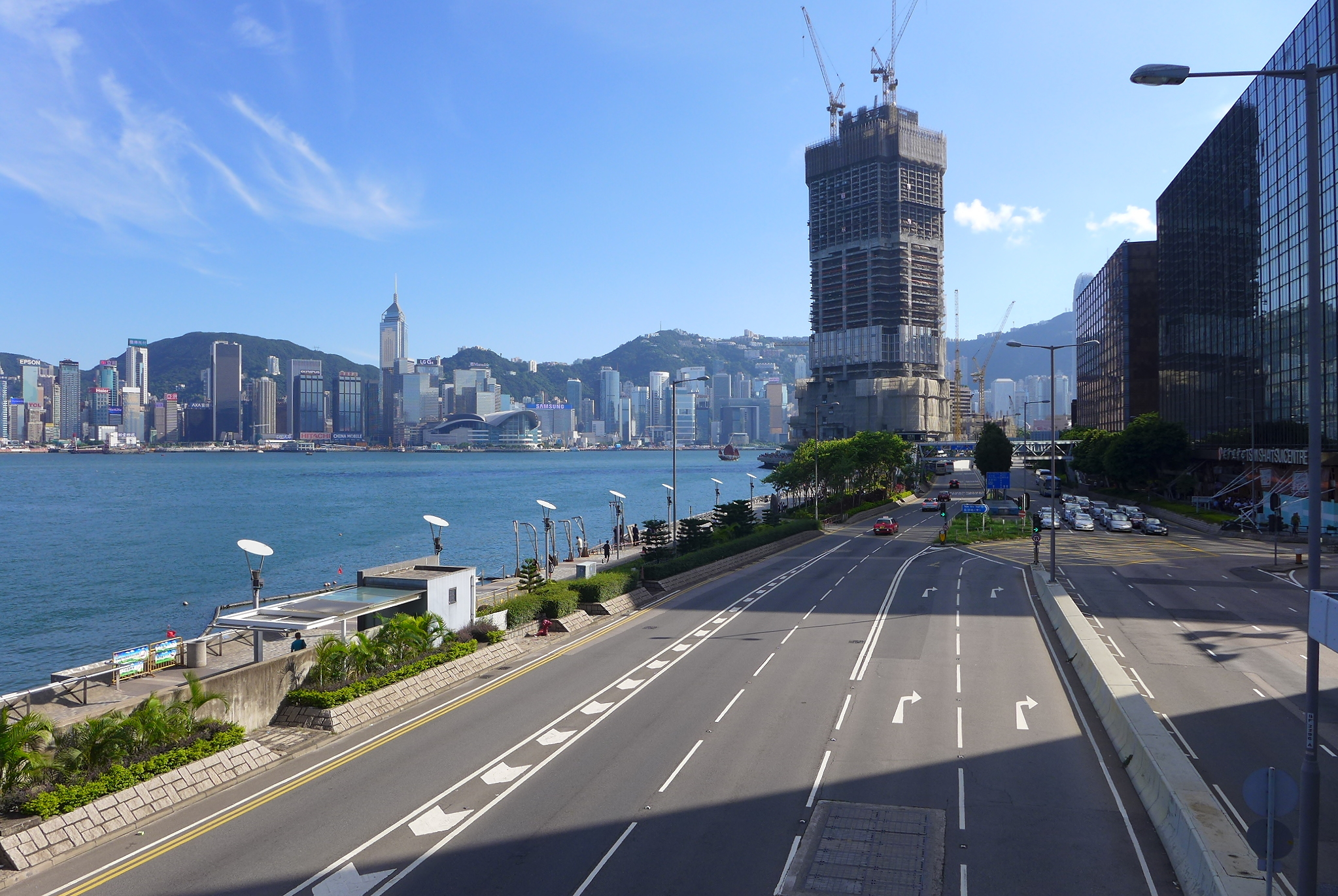
- Salisbury Road in East Tsim Sha Tsui in August 2015
- Interactive map of Salisbury Road
- Native name: 梳士巴利道
- Namesake: Robert Gascoyne-Cecil, 3rd Marquess of Salisbury
- Maintained by: Highways Department
- Length: 2.0 km (1.2 mi)
- Location: Yau Tsim Mong District
- West end: Star Ferry Pier, Tsim Sha Tsui
- East end: Hung Hom Bay

Salisbury Road
- Chinese: 梳士巴利道
Transcriptions
Standard Mandarin
- Hanyu Pinyin: Shūshìbālì Dào
Yue: Cantonese
- Yale Romanization: sō sih bā leih douh
- Jyutping: so1 si6 ba1 lei6 dou6
- IPA: [sɔ́ːsìːpáːlèi tòu]

Former name
- Chinese: 梳利士巴利道
Transcriptions
Standard Mandarin
- Hanyu Pinyin: Shūlìshìbālì Dào
Yue: Cantonese
- Jyutping: so1 lei6 si6 ba1 lei6 dou6

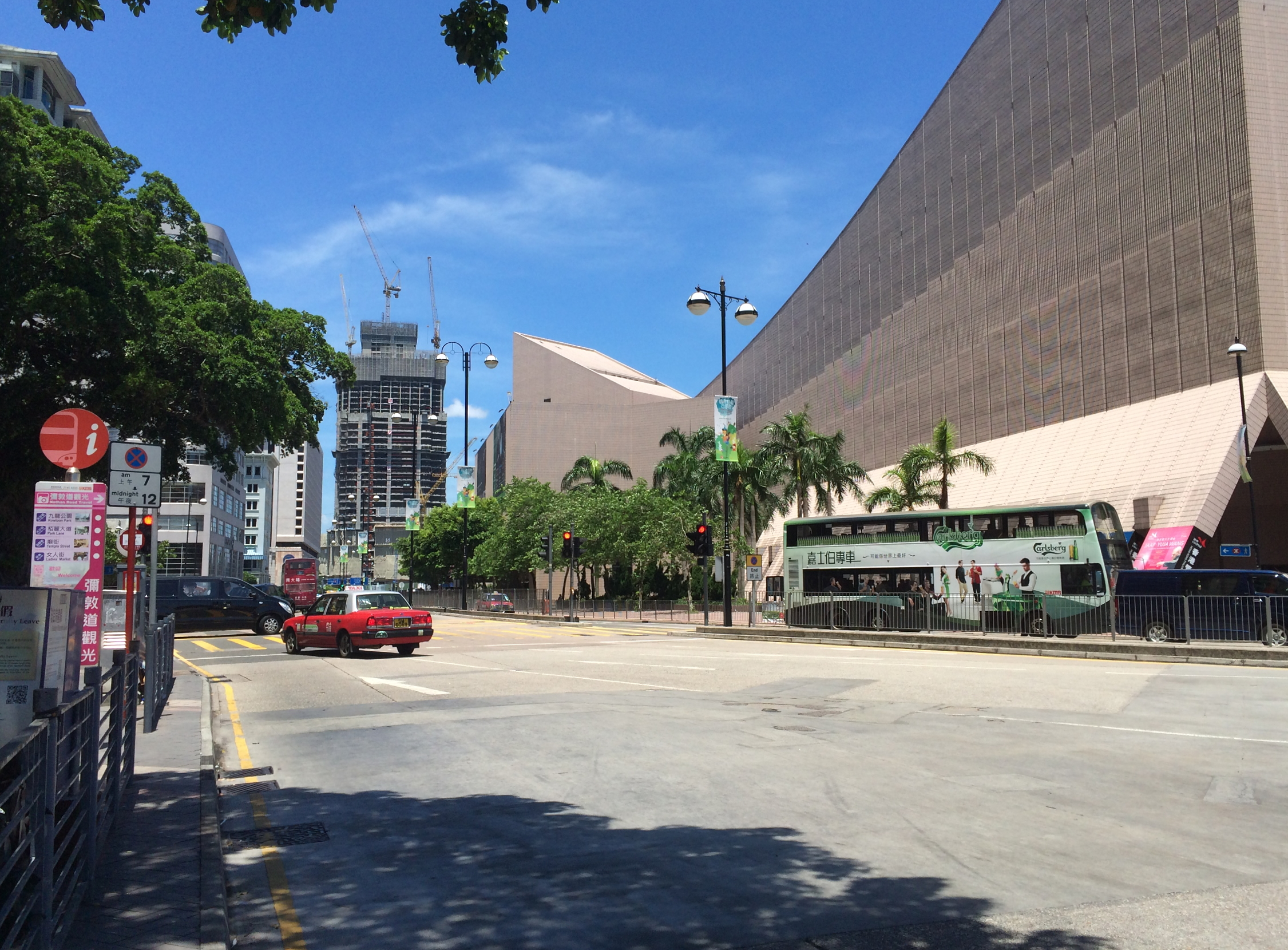
Salisbury Road near Cultural Centre in June 2015

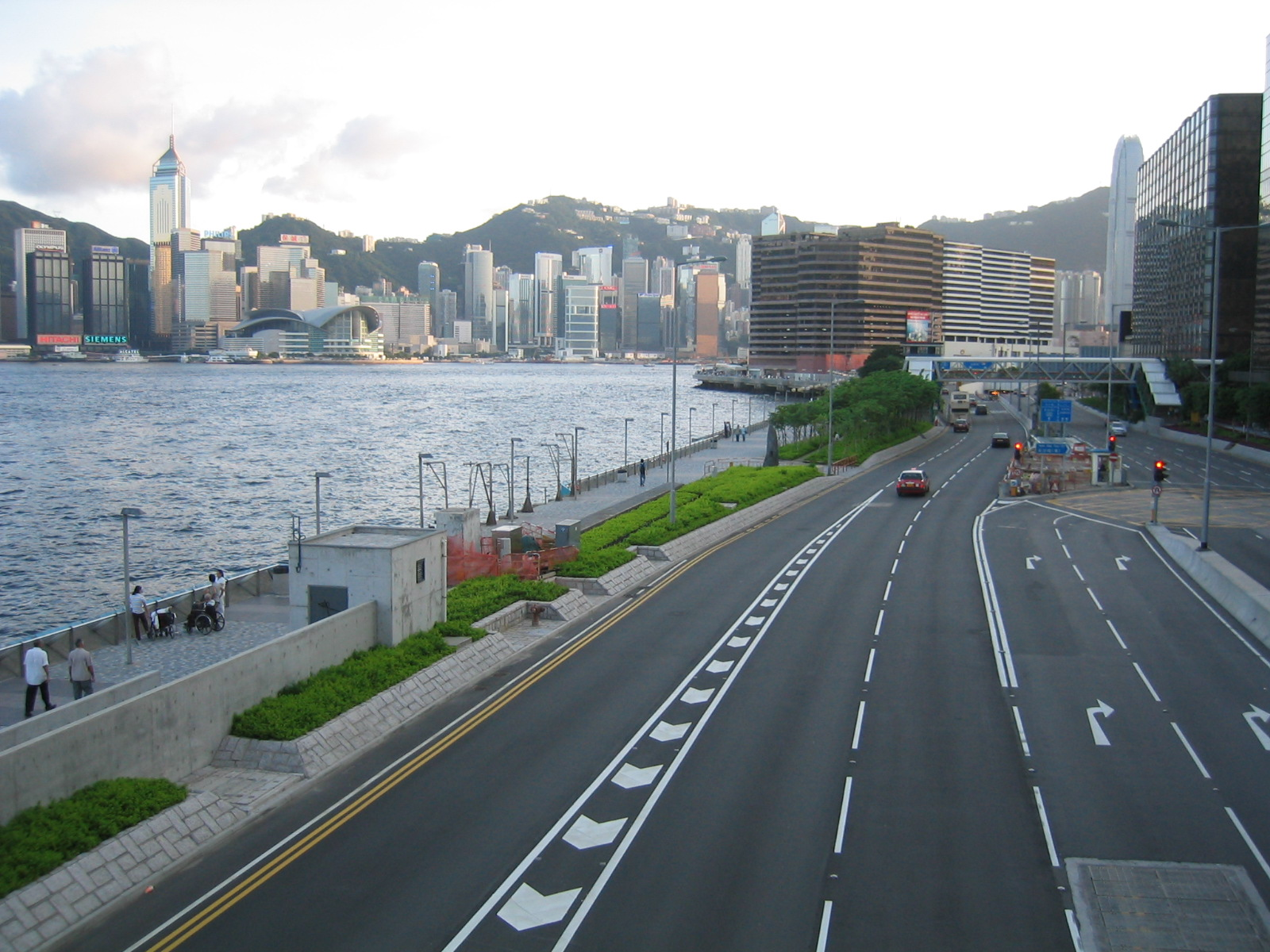
Salisbury Road by the waterfront at Tsim Sha Tsui East in August 2005

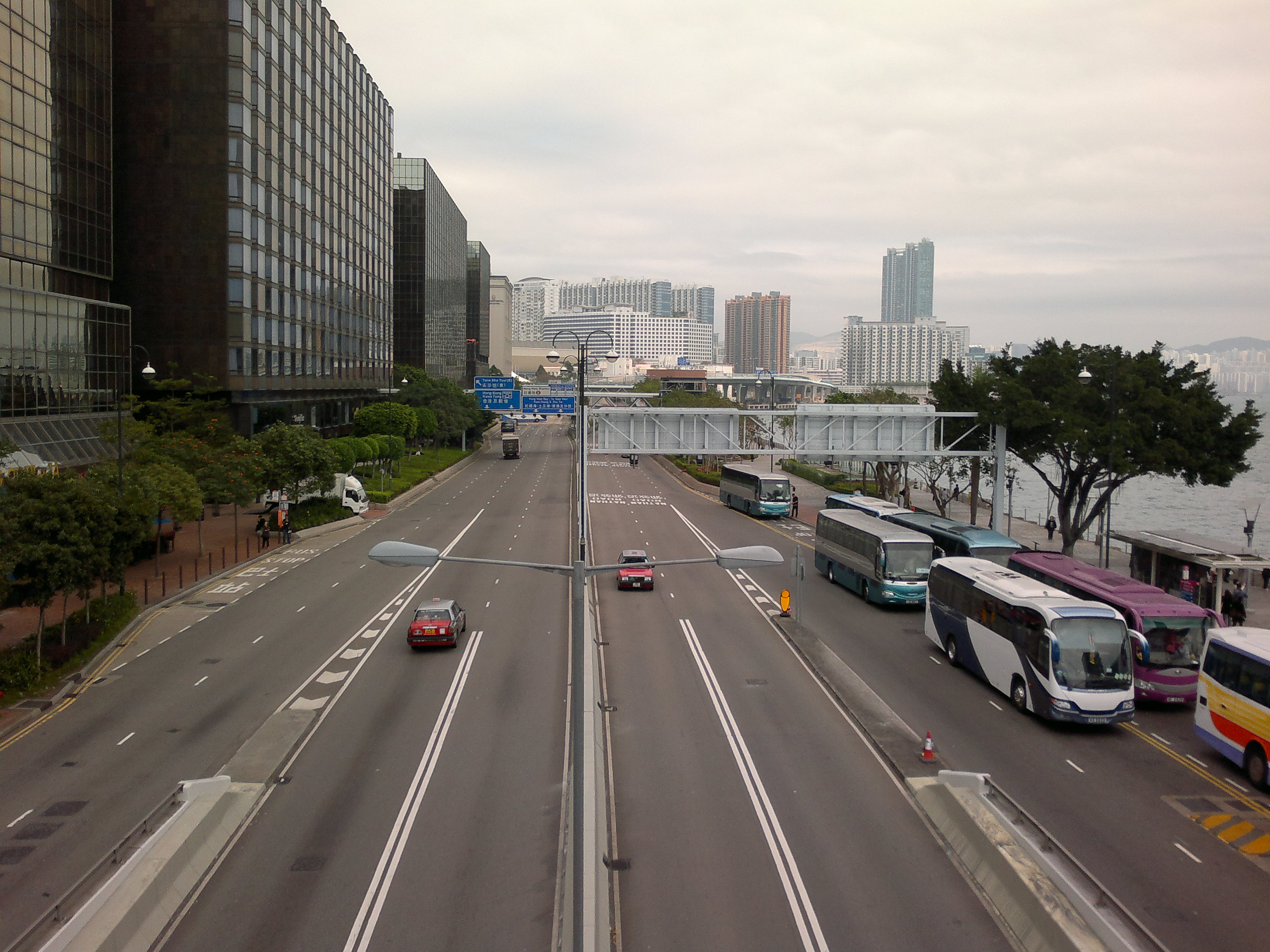
Nearby location as above, looking in the opposite direction in March 2012

Salisbury Road (Chinese: 梳士巴利道; Jyutping: so1 si6 baa1 lei6 dou6) is a major road in Tsim Sha Tsui, Kowloon, Hong Kong.

== Description ==
It runs parallel to Victoria Harbour, starting from its western end at the Star Ferry Pier, passing by Blackhead Point, to Tsim Sha Tsui East. It intersects with several major roads in the area, including Canton Road, Kowloon Park Drive, Nathan Road and Chatham Road South, and connects to the Hung Hom Bypass at its eastern end.

=== Landmarks ===
Several Hong Kong landmarks and points of interest are located along or near Salisbury Road, including the Star House, the 1881 Heritage complex (including the Former Marine Police Headquarters and the Old Kowloon Fire Station), YMCA of Hong Kong, The Peninsula Hong Kong, Regent Hong Kong, Rosewood Hong Kong, the Hong Kong Space Museum, the Hong Kong Cultural Centre, the Hong Kong Museum of Art, Victoria Dockside and the Tsim Sha Tsui Clock Tower. The Tsim Sha Tsui East Promenade, which runs alongside the road, has views of the Hong Kong skyline across Victoria Harbour.

== History ==
=== Naming ===
The road was named after Robert Gascoyne-Cecil, 3rd Marquess of Salisbury, who served as the British prime minister in late 19th century.

The original transliteration of the road in Chinese, "梳利士巴利道", failed to account for the fact that the i in the word is silent. The Hong Kong Government corrected the transliteration in the 1970s by dropping the second character "利 (lei6)", and adopting the current name "梳士巴利道".

=== Railway ===
Salisbury Road was extended westwards to the tip of Tsim Sha Tsui in 1904. Train and ferry termini were erected at its end. The Kowloon–Canton Railway originally ran along Salisbury Road, and its terminus Kowloon station was located at the western end of road. The terminus was moved to Hung Hom station in 1974, and the station complex at Salisbury Road (except the Clock Tower) was demolished in 1977. However, the KCR returned to the area in 2004, when the East Rail extension was opened. The extension runs underneath Salisbury Road, with its station East Tsim Sha Tsui station located underneath the intersection of Salisbury Road and Chatham Road South.

== Intersections ==
The entire route is in Yau Tsim Mong District.

| Location | km | mi | Destinations | Notes |
|---|---|---|---|---|
| Hung Hom Bay | 0.0 | 0.0 | Route 1 south (Hong Chong Road) | Eastern terminus; Begin one-way road |
| Hung Hom Bay | 0.3 | 0.19 | Hong Chong Road / Science Museum Road | Begin two-way road |
| Tsim Sha Tsui | 0.9 | 0.56 | Hung Hom Bypass / Mody Lane | To/from eastbound only |
| Tsim Sha Tsui | 1.1– 1.6 | 0.68– 0.99 | Chatham Road South | Diamond interchange with Texas U-turns |
| Tsim Sha Tsui | 1.5 | 0.93 | Middle Road | Eastbound exit only |
| Tsim Sha Tsui | 1.6 | 0.99 | Nathan Road | |
| Tsim Sha Tsui | 1.8 | 1.1 | Hankow Road | |
| Tsim Sha Tsui | 1.8 | 1.1 | Kowloon Park Drive | |
| Tsim Sha Tsui | 2.0 | 1.2 | Tsim Sha Tsui Ferry Pier bus terminus | Western terminus |
1.000 mi = 1.609 km; 1.000 km = 0.621 mi: Incomplete access

== See also ==
- Victoria Dockside
- YMCA of Hong Kong
- New World Centre
- List of streets and roads in Hong Kong

== Bibliography ==
- Hong Kong Guide 2006, Survey and Mapping Office, Government of Hong Kong.
