= Tony Chi =

American interior designer

- Born: Taipei, Taiwan
- Education: High School of Art and Design; Fashion Institute of Technology
- Occupation: Interior designer
- Spouse: Tammy Chou

Tony Chi is an American interior designer. He is the co-founder of New York-based design firm tonychi studio together with Tammy Chou.

== Early life and education ==
Chi was born in Taipei, Taiwan, the youngest of five children. He later moved to New York's Lower East Side at the age of six. He attended the High School of Art and Design and studied interior design at the Fashion Institute of Technology (FIT).

== Career ==
After graduating from FIT in 1984, Chi and his wife opened a Hunan-Sichuan restaurant, which later closed in 1996.

Chi got his start designing restaurants for Charles Morris Mount Design, and left to found his namesake studio in 1984 with wife Tammy Chou.

Following the stock market crash of 1987, Chi traveled abroad to create food and beverage concepts throughout Asia from Hong Kong to Jakarta. In Hong Kong, he met the real estate developer Allan Zeman and restaurateur Paul Hsu, and the trio started transforming the island's Lan Kwai Fong district into an entertainment destination, which was the start of his international career in design.

Chi later designed restaurants for chefs like Wolfgang Puck, Alain Ducasse and Michael Mina. Later, Chi began to expand his portfolio to include hotel interiors, from Santiago to Geneva, developing his signature "invisible design" aesthetic, or that which you do not necessarily see, but feel and perceive.

In 2019, Chi's daughter Alison Chi took lead as the head of creative development at his studio, with long-time associate William "Bill" Paley as creative director and lead designer. Paley departed in 2021 to co-found his own firm, 44LLC.

== Notable projects ==
Notable hospitality projects in the tonychi studio portfolio include:

- Park Hyatt Shanghai (2008)
- W Santiago (2009)
- Andaz 5th Avenue New York (2010)
- Ararat Park Hyatt Moscow (2011)
- Grand Hyatt Erawan, Bangkok (2012)
- Grand Hyatt Berlin (2013)
- InterContinental Geneva (2013)
- Mandarin Oriental Guangzhou (2013)
- Rosewood London (2013)
- Andaz Tokyo Toranomon Hills (2014)
- Grand Hyatt Chengdu (2016)
- Park Hyatt Washington (2006, 2017)
- Park Hyatt Kyoto (2019)
- Rosewood Hong Kong (2019)
- Andaz Shenzhen Bay (2021)
- The Carlyle, a Rosewood Hotel (2021)
- Grand Hyatt Gurgaon (2022)

== Awards ==
Chi was inducted into Interior Design's Hall of Fame in 2009 and awarded FIT's Lawrence Israel Prize in 2015.
