= New World Centre =

Skyscraper in Hong Kong, demolished in 2010

Coordinates: 22°17′40.29″N 114°10′27.09″E

- Chinese: 新世界中心
Transcriptions
Standard Mandarin
- Hanyu Pinyin: Xīn Shìjiè Zhōngxīn
Yue: Cantonese
- Jyutping: san1 sai3 gaai3 zung1 sam1

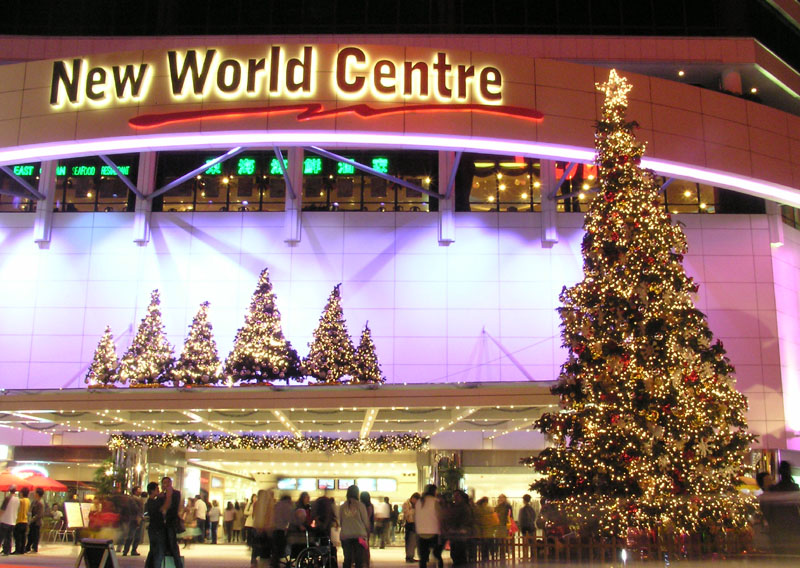
The New World Centre by night

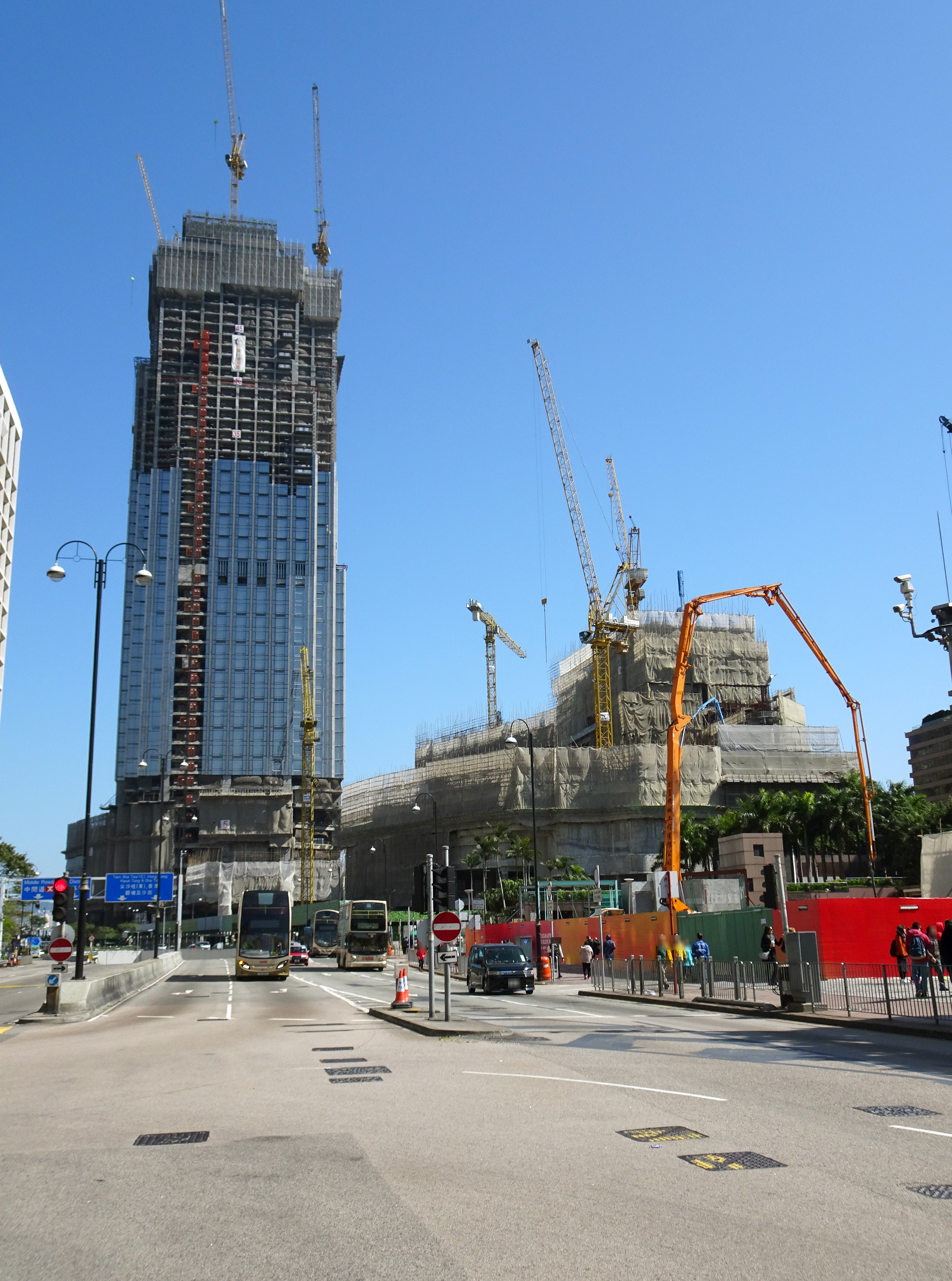
New World Centre remodeling project

The New World Centre (Chinese: 新世界中心) was a retail-hotel-residential-office complex on Salisbury Road, Tsim Sha Tsui, Kowloon, Hong Kong. It housed two hotels (InterContinental Hong Kong, now closed for renovation in order to rebrand as Regent Hong Kong in 2022, and the now-demolished Renaissance Kowloon), two office towers, a shopping complex and serviced apartments. It was reported to be one of the largest commercial complexes in the world at the time. It used to house a Tokyu Department Store. It was located near the Sogo department store and the Hong Kong Space Museum, opposite the MTR East Tsim Sha Tsui station.

It was closed on 31 March 2010 for demolition. It was replaced by the New World Development Co. Ltd.'s new 63-storey Victoria Dockside tower and a hotel by the Rosewood Hotel Group, and opened in 2019.

== Gallery ==
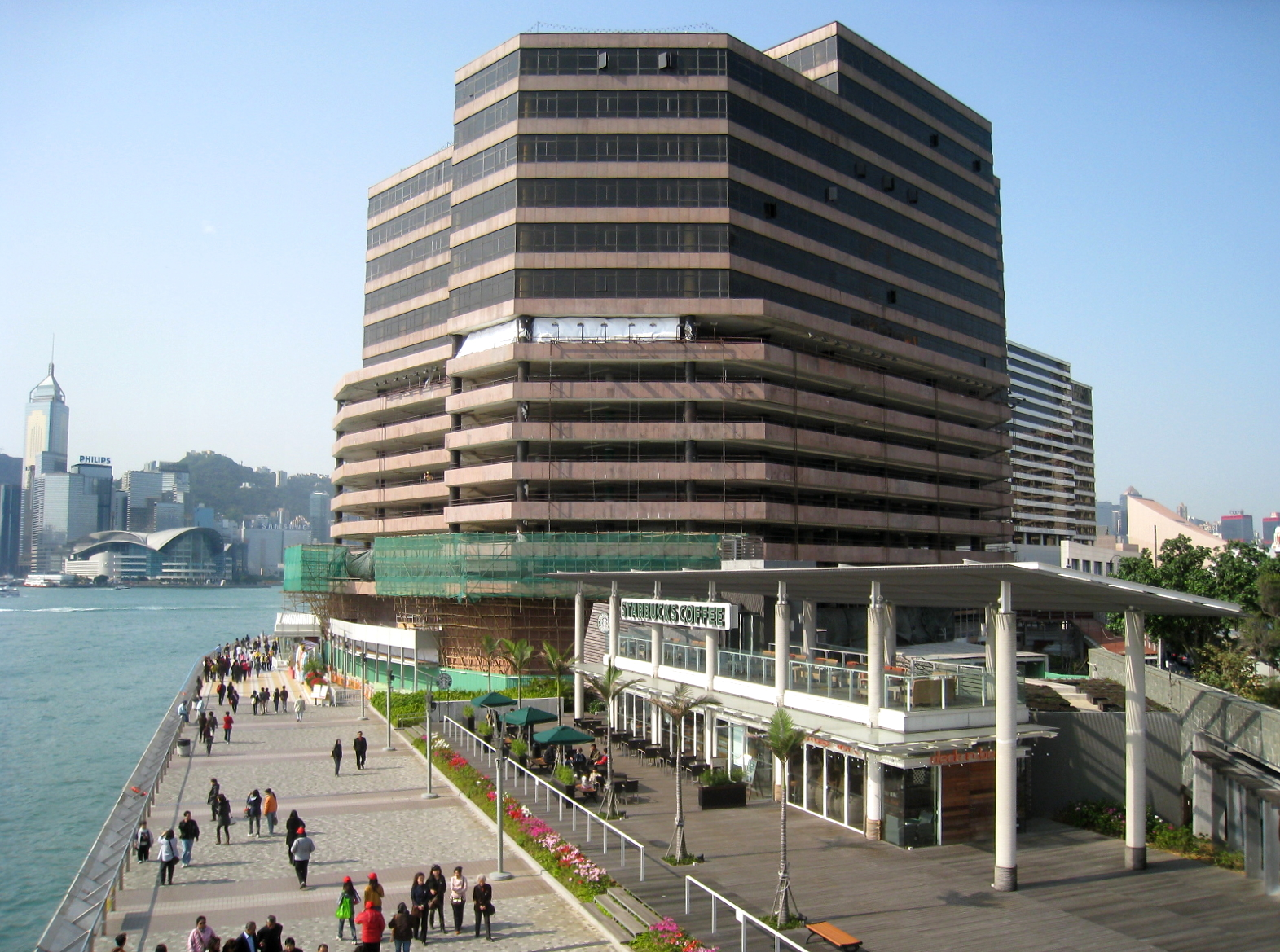
East Wing Office Building

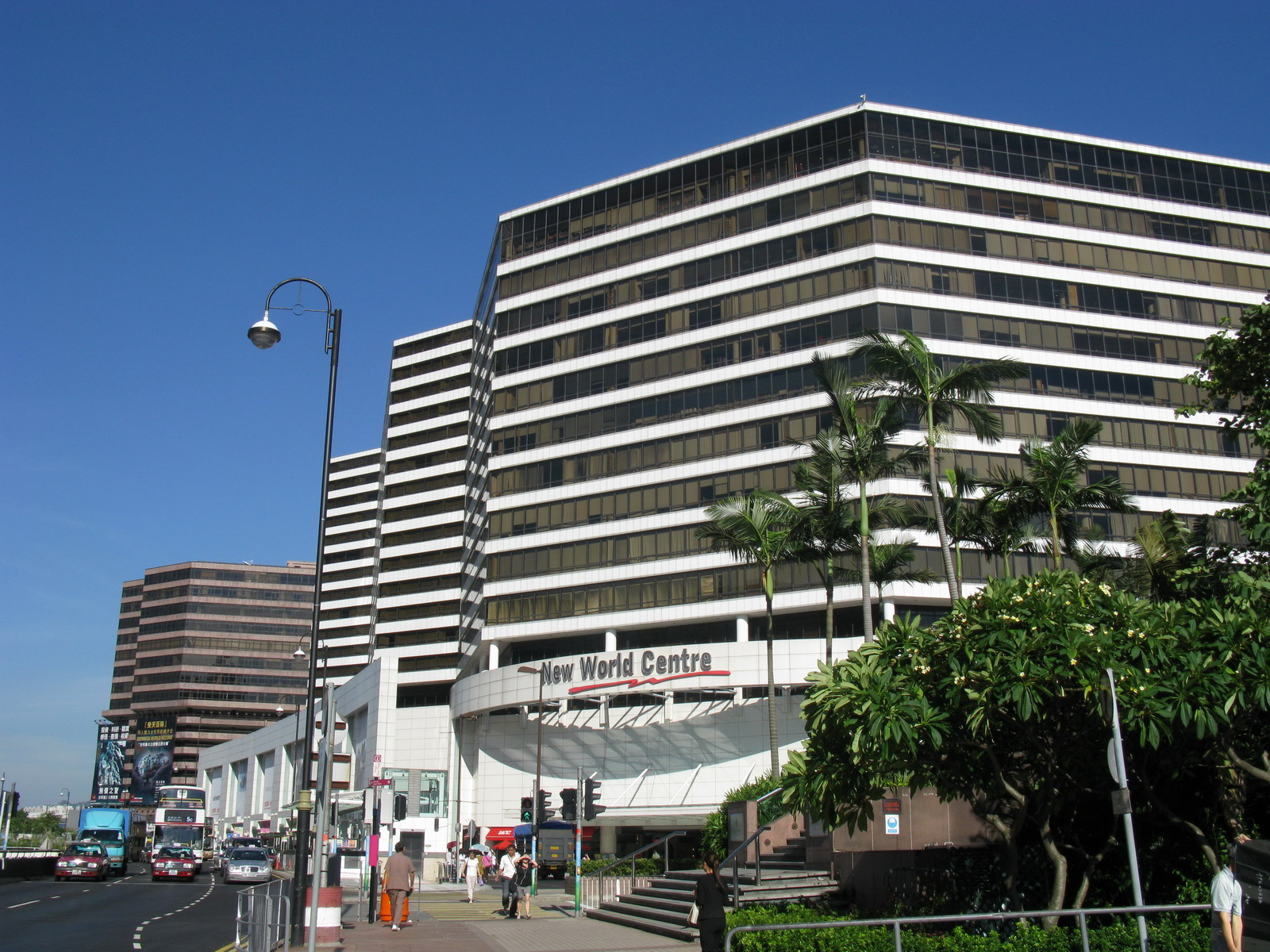
West Wing Office Building

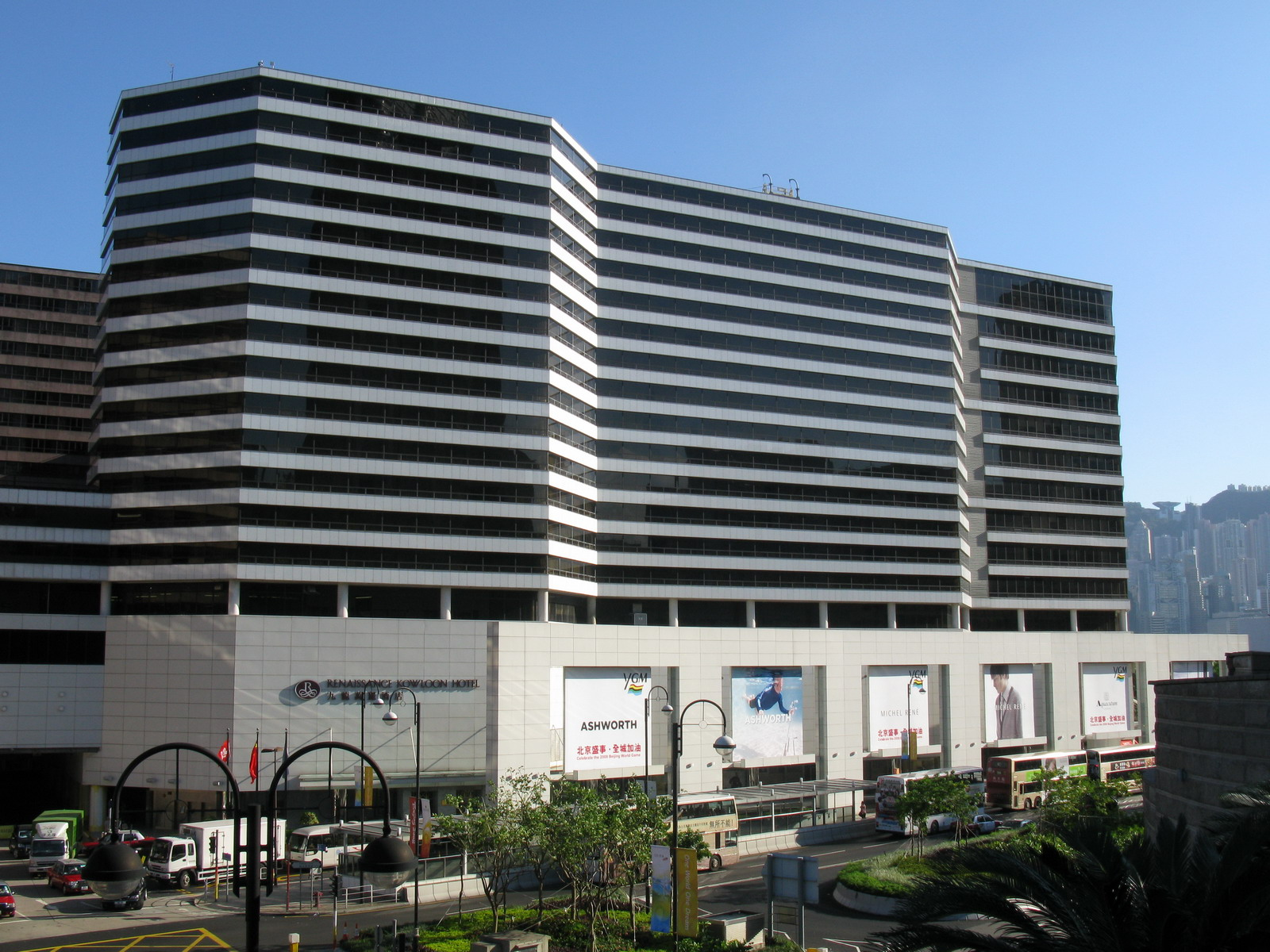
Renaissance Kowloon Hotel

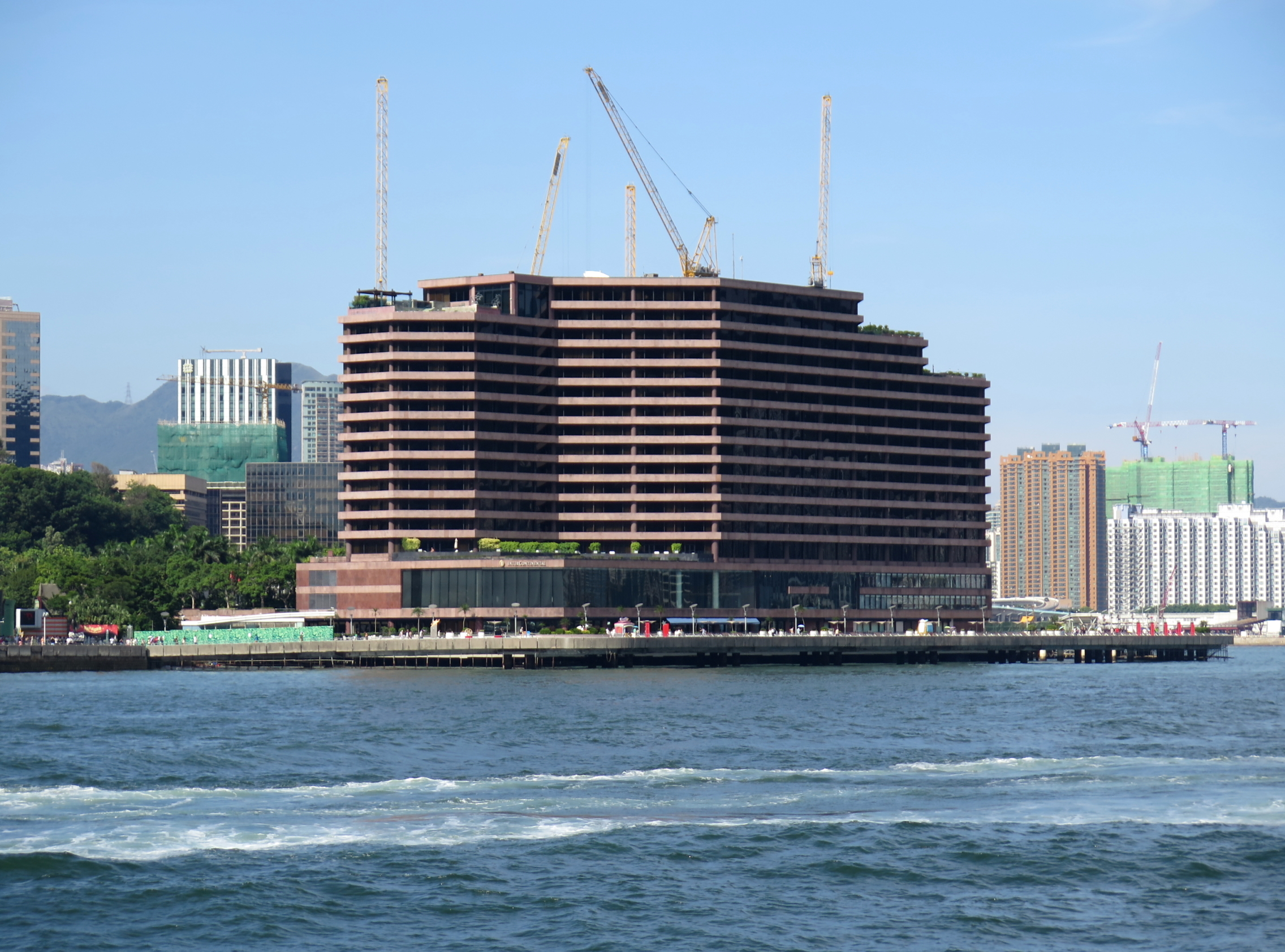
InterContinental Hong Kong

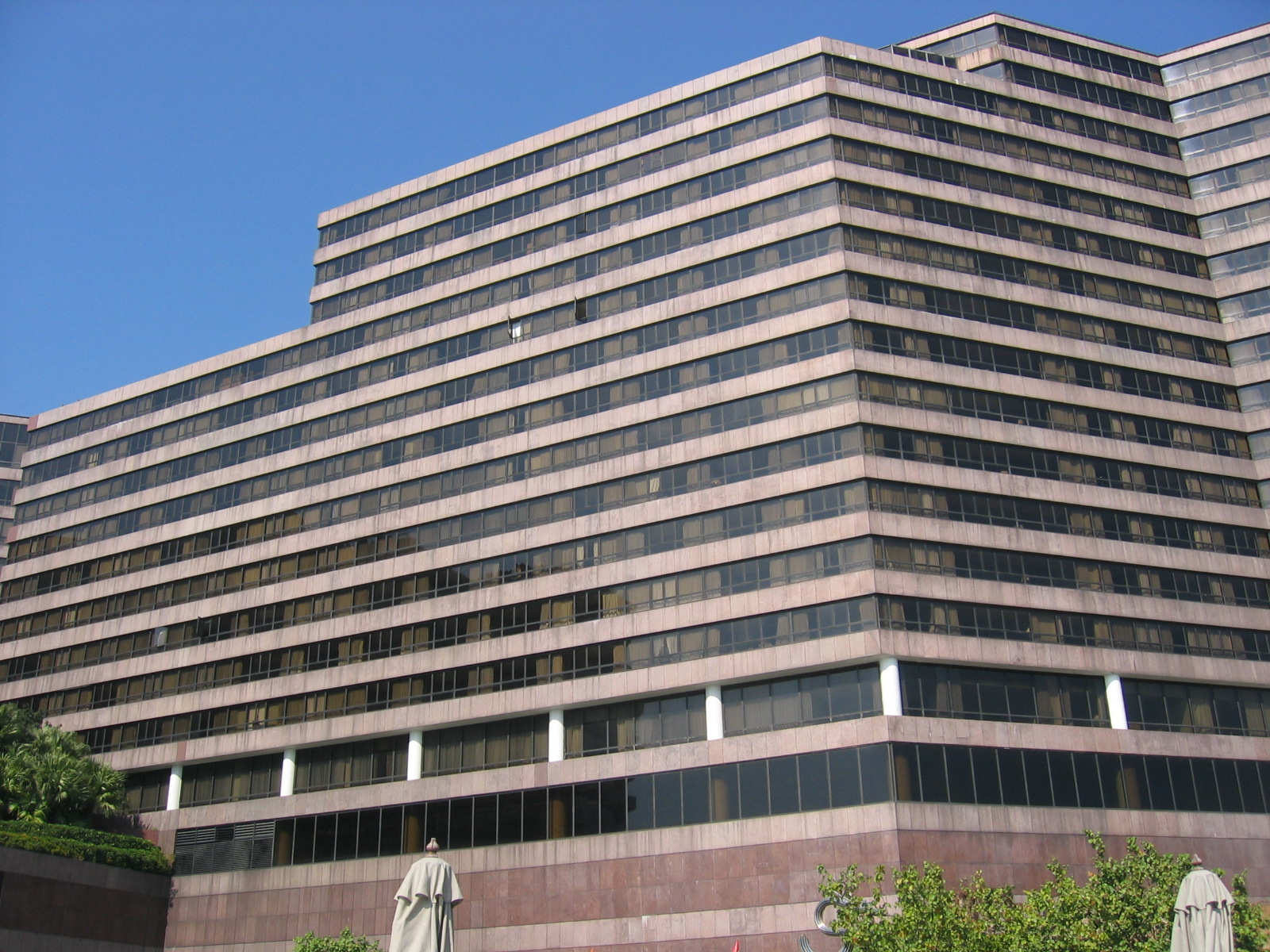
New World Apartments

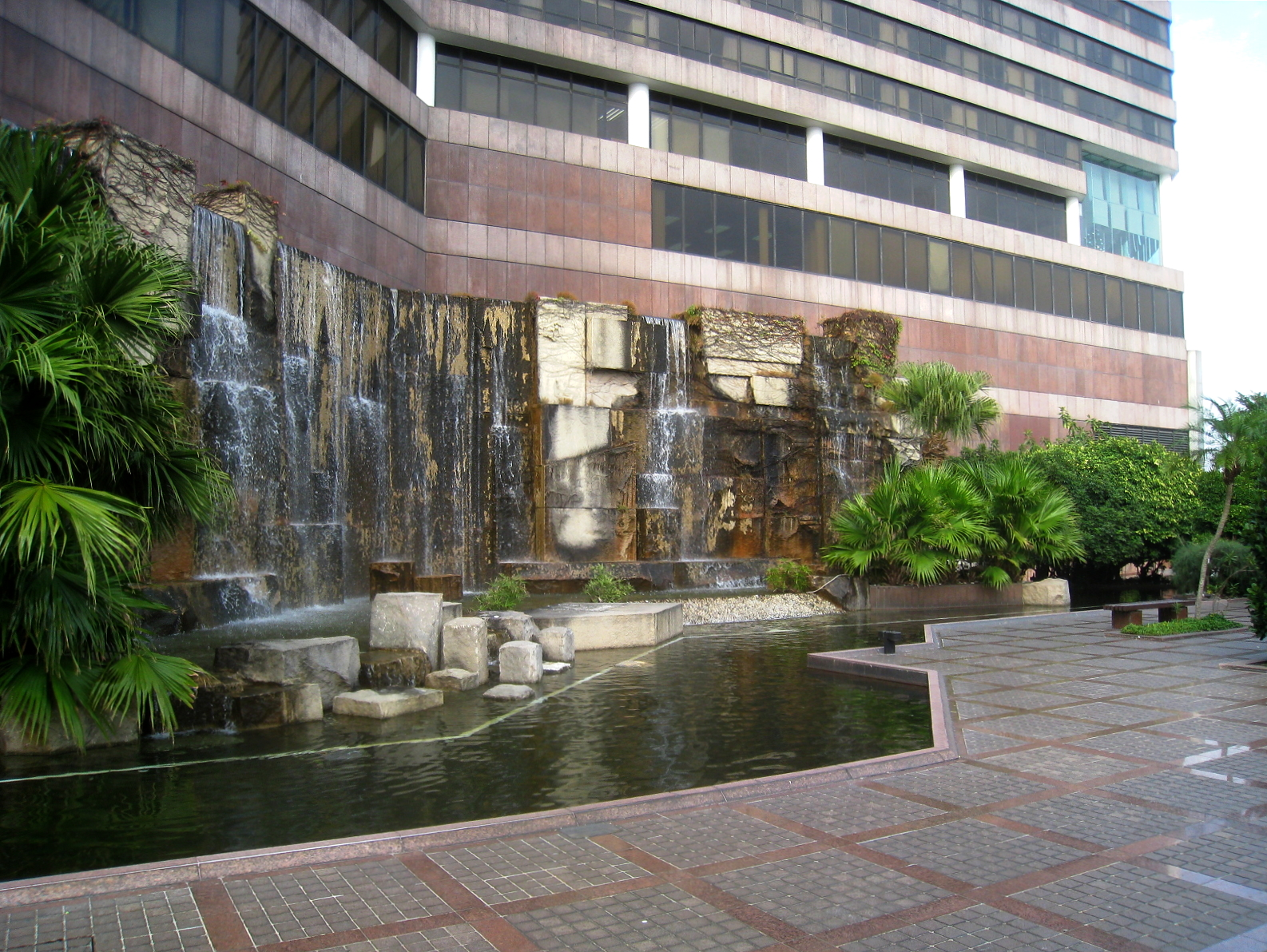
Waterfall outside the building

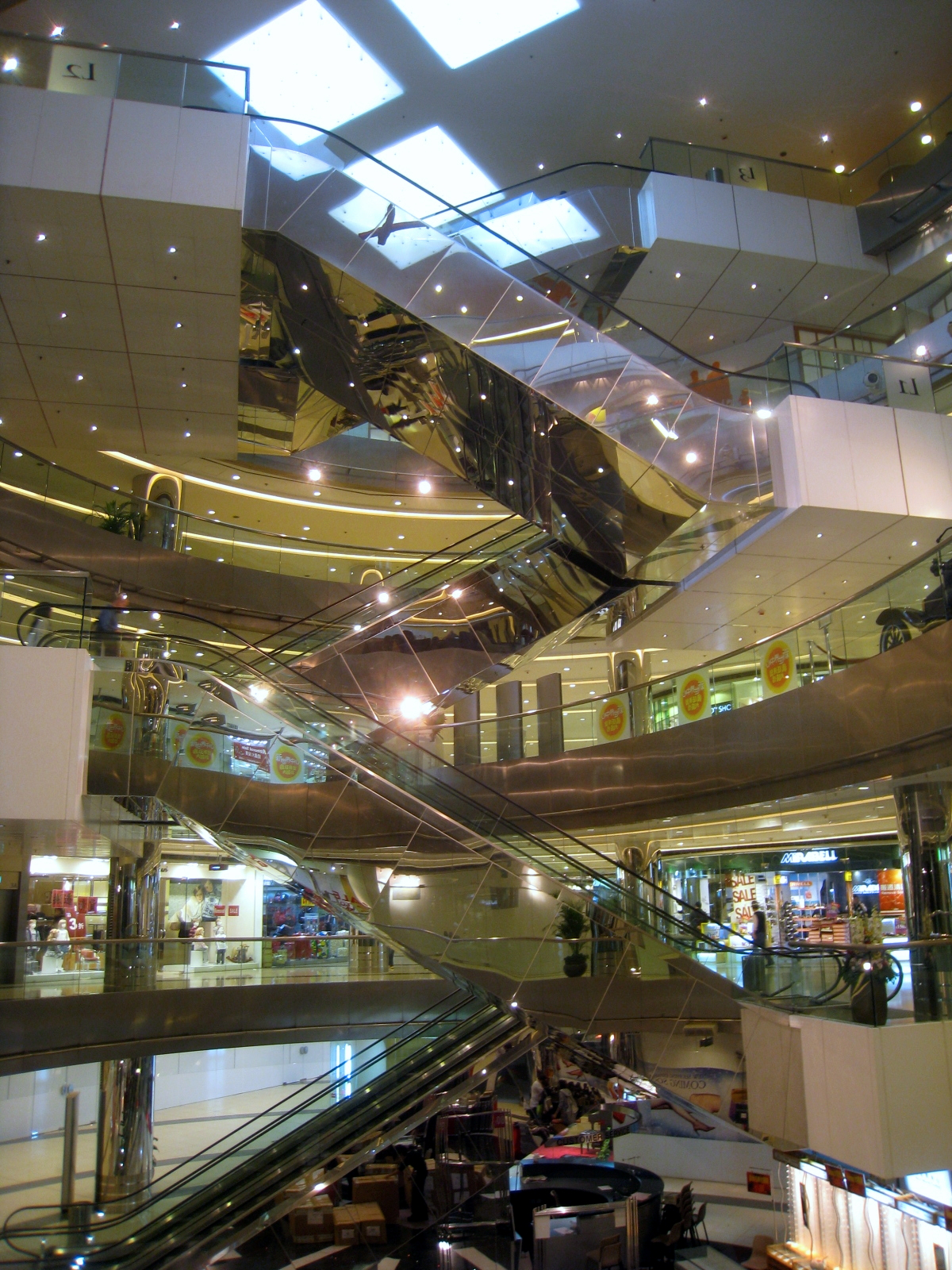
Atrium
