= Regent Hong Kong =

Hotel in Tsim Sha Tsui, Hong Kong

Coordinates: 22°17′36.5″N 114°10′26.2″E

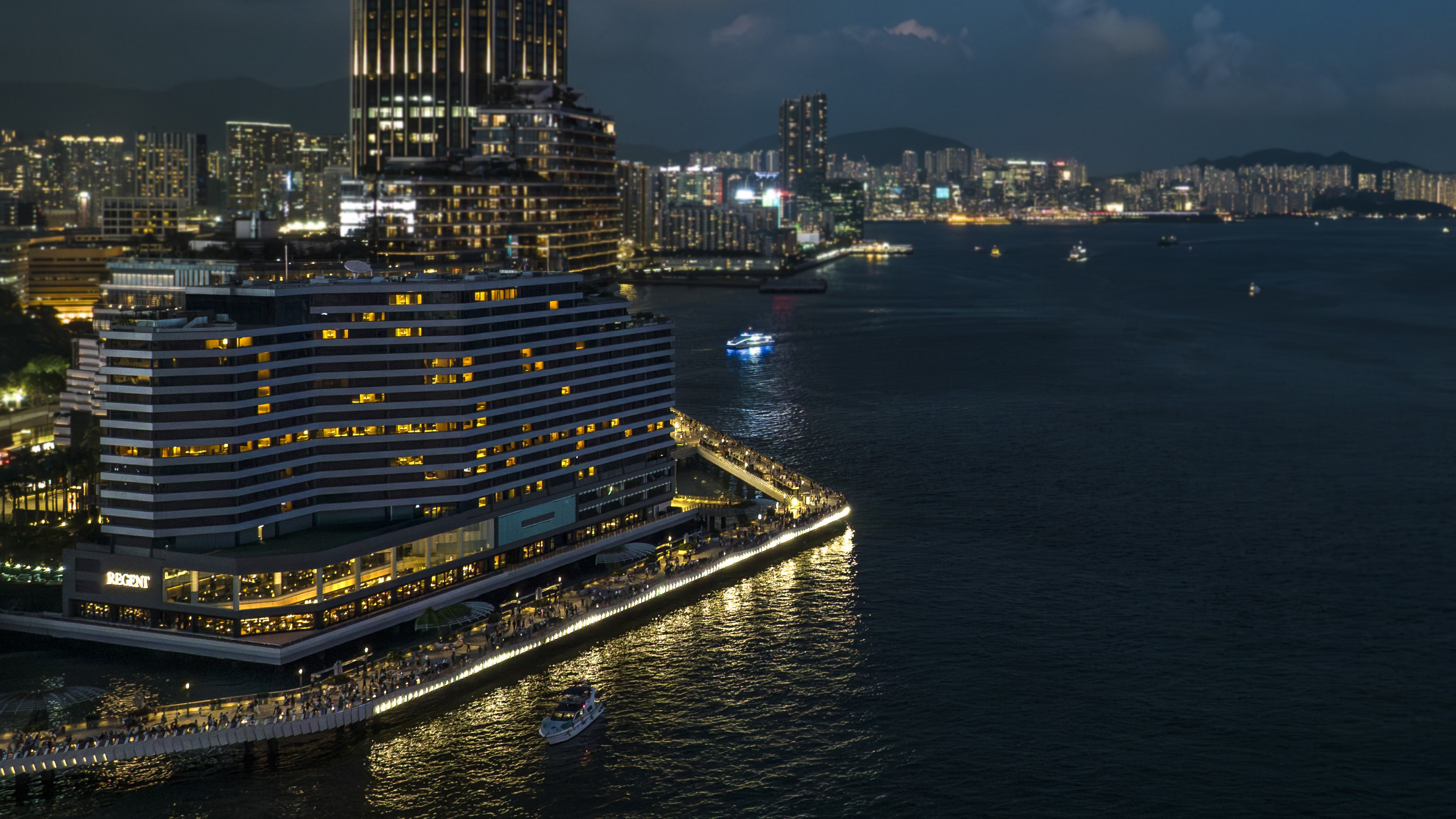
- Regent Hong Kong in 2023

- Location within Hong Kong urban core

General information
- Location: 18 Salisbury Road, Tsim Sha Tsui, Kowloon; Hong Kong
- Opening: 1980; 42 years ago (as The Regent Hong Kong); 2001; 21 years ago (rebranded to InterContinental Hong Kong); November 8, 2023 (officially reopened as Regent Hong Kong)
- Closed: April 20, 2020 – December 26, 2022, for a major transformation and rebranding from InterContinental Hong Kong to Regent Hong Kong, when the hotel soft-opened some of its restaurants
- Owner: Supreme Key Limited
- Operator: Regent Hotels & Resorts

Design and construction
- Developer: New World Development

Other information
- Number of rooms: 497

Website
- hongkong.regenthotels.com

Regent Hong Kong
- Traditional Chinese: 香港麗晶酒店
- Simplified Chinese: 香港丽晶酒店
Transcriptions
Standard Mandarin
- Hanyu Pinyin: Xiānggǎng Zhōujì Jiǔdiàn
Yue: Cantonese
- Jyutping: hoeng1 gong2 zau1 zai3 zau2 dim3

The Regent Hong Kong
- Traditional Chinese: 麗晶酒店
- Simplified Chinese: 丽晶酒店
Transcriptions
Standard Mandarin
- Hanyu Pinyin: Lìjīng Jiǔdiàn
Yue: Cantonese
- Jyutping: lai6 ing1 zau2 dim3

Regent Hong Kong is a five-star hotel located at 18 Salisbury Road, Kowloon, Hong Kong. The hotel is positioned directly on the waterfront, has 497 rooms and is considered a flagship property of Regent Hotels & Resorts and a landmark property within IHG Hotels & Resorts' luxury and lifestyle portfolio.

== History ==
The hotel opened in 1980 as The Regent Hong Kong, owned by New World Development and managed by Regent International Hotels. It was built as the flagship property of RIH, founded by hotelier Robert H. Burns and Japan's Tokyu Hotels Group in 1970. In 1992, the Regent Hotels group was acquired by Four Seasons Hotels.

On May 21, 2001, New World sold the hotel to Bass Hotels and Resorts for US$346 million and it was rebranded as the InterContinental Hong Kong on June 1, 2001. Four Seasons Hotels, which owned Regent Hotels at the time, controlled 25% of the property's management contract, causing them to enter rent arbitration with New World, which was resolved in August 2001, when New World agreed to pay Four Seasons an unspecified amount.

In July 2015, InterContinental Hotels Group (IHG), the successor company to Bass Hotels and Resorts, agreed to sell InterContinental Hong Kong to Supreme Key Limited, a consortium of investors, for US$938 million. It was reported that IHG will retain a 37-year management contract, with three 10-year extension rights.

In March 2018, when IHG Hotels & Resorts acquired a majority-stake in Regent Hotels, it was announced that following renovations, the hotel would be rebranded back to Regent Hong Kong. InterContinental Hong Kong officially ceased operations on April 20, 2020 to commence the three-year renovation and conversion to Regent Hong Kong.

On 8 November 2023, the relaunched Regent celebrated its official opening, with Managing Director Michel Chertouh leading the reopening of Regent Hong Kong.

In 2025, Regent Hong Kong received a Five-Star rating from the Forbes Travel Guide and was ranked #1 City Hotel in Asia and Hong Kong in the World’s Best Awards, as well as #1 Best Hong Kong Hotel in the Luxury Awards Asia Pacific, by Travel + Leisure. In the same year, it was named Best Brand Hotel at Virtuoso Travel Week and was included among the Top 5 Best Hotels in Hong Kong in the US Readers’ Choice Awards by Condé Nast Traveler.

== Facilities ==
The hotel has 497 rooms and was designed by Hong Kong-born designer Chi Wing Lo.

The guestrooms opened in stages from March 2023 onwards. In June 2024 the hotel unveiled its Signature Suite Collection (Presidential Suite, Terrace Suite and CEO Suite), a trio of residential retreats with private rooftop terraces and views of Victoria Harbour and the Hong Kong skyline.

The 7,000-square-foot duplex Presidential Suite includes a rooftop terrace with an infinity pool. The newly expanded 5,500-square-foot Terrace Suite is a one-bedroom duplex. The 4,200-square-foot two-bedroom CEO Suite features a living room with large windows overlooking the rooftop terrace and Victoria Harbour.

Regent Hong Kong is known for hosting some of the city's events, including galas and weddings. The hotel entrance features a cascading fountain, while the marble staircase near the Lobby leads to the pillarless Regent Ballroom. In addition to the Regent Ballroom, ten function venues with panoramic harbour views are available for events.

=== Restaurants & Bars ===
The hotel has six restaurants and bars.

On 26 December 2022, Regent Hong Kong opened with three restaurants: The Steak House, the Lobby Lounge and Harbourside. These venues launched before the hotel rooms were completed.

In December 2022, the Michelin-starred restaurant Yan Toh Heen was renamed back to its original name, Lai Ching Heen, while continuing to offer its Cantonese cuisine. Nobu Hong Kong, which initially opened in 2006 as the first Nobu restaurant in Asia outside Japan, returned to the hotel in November 2023.

Additionally, in December 2023, the hotel launched Qura Bar, a venue with a focus on rare spirits, a private dining room, and a cigar bar.

== In popular culture ==
The hotel has received many notable guests and been featured in various films, television shows, and travel programs. Notable guests who stayed at the hotel included royalty from the UK, US presidents including Jimmy Carter, Richard Nixon, Gerald Ford, and George Bush, and celebrities such as Frank Sinatra, Elizabeth Taylor, Catherine Deneuve, Sidney Poitier, Roger Moore, Robert DeNiro, Charles Bronson, Julio Iglesias, Tom Jones, Bo Derek, Meg Ryan, Barbara Walters, Calvin Klein, Angelina Jolie and Brad Pitt.

The hotel has also been featured in various film scenes including the TV miniseries Noble House (1988) and TV movie Nightwatch (1995), both with Pierce Brosnan and US TV series Dynasty (1985). A list of television programs filmed at the hotel includes Danish TV series Borgen (2012) and NBC's Better Late Than Never (2016), while the feature film Lost in Hong Kong (2015) with Xu Zhen shot scenes in the hotel's Presidential Suite.

The hotel has also been a location for shooting popular music videos including Japanese pop icon Ayumi's "Distance Love" music video in 2007 and Jay Chou's "Give Me the Time for One Song (Gei Wo Yi Shou Ge De Shi Jian)" in 2008).
