= Pink diamond =

Type of diamond that has pink color

Pink Diamond
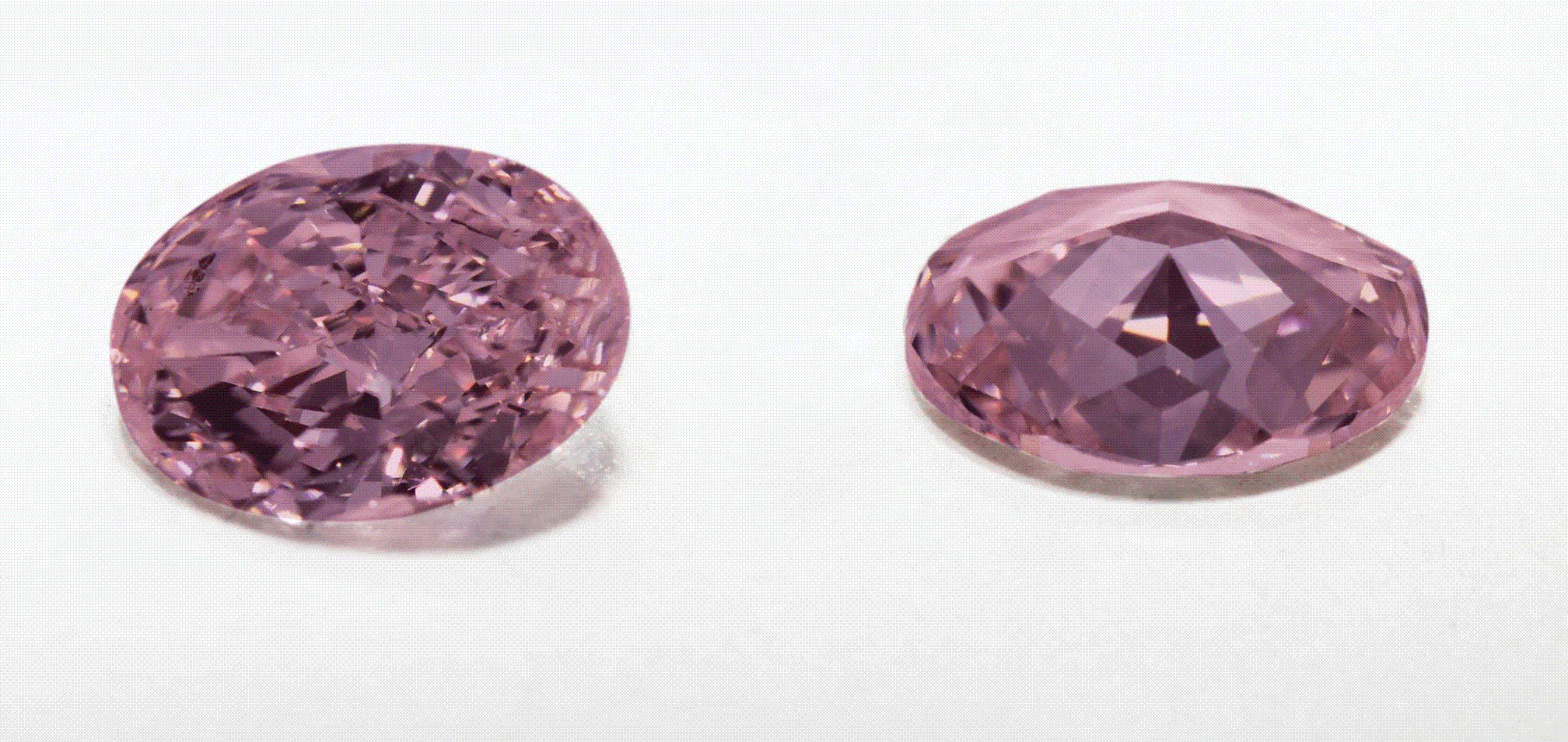
- Some polished pink diamonds

General
- Category: Native minerals
- Formula: C
- Strunz classification: 1.CB.10a
- Crystal system: Cubic
- Crystal class: Hexoctahedral (m3̅m); H-M symbol: (4/m 3̅ 2/m)

Identification
- Formula mass: 12.01 g/mol
- Color: Faint pink to deep pink
- Crystal habit: Octahedral
- Twinning: Spinel law common (yielding "macle")
- Cleavage: 111 (perfect in four directions)
- Fracture: Conchoidal (shell-like)
- Mohs scale hardness: 10 (defining mineral)
- Luster: Adamantine
- Diaphaneity: Transparent to subtransparent to translucent
- Specific gravity: 3.52±0.01
- Density: 3.5–3.53 g/cm^{3}
- Polish luster: Adamantine
- Optical properties: Isotropic
- Refractive index: 2.418 (at 500 nm)
- Birefringence: None
- Pleochroism: None
- Dispersion: 0.044
- Melting point: Pressure dependent

Pink diamonds are a type of diamond that has a pink color. The source of their pink color is greatly debated in the gemological world but it is most commonly attributed to plastic deformation that these diamonds undergo during their formation.

Pink diamonds belong to a category of diamonds called color diamonds, the generic name for all diamonds that exhibit any sort of color. Pink diamonds range from flawless to included, as do colorless diamonds.

== Color theories ==
Numerous theories have been posited as to how the pink is formed in pink diamonds. The prevailing theory is that the pink is caused when the diamond is subjected to shear pressure during its formation. A similar theory is being tested on pink diamonds that originated in the Argyle Diamond Mine in Kimberley, Western Australia. This theory posits that a seismic shock propelled colorless diamonds to the surface and altered their molecular structure, causing them to appear pink.

Further to these theories, recent research has also indicated that pink diamonds might owe their distinctive hue to radiation exposure. As per some studies, the presence of trace amounts of radiation could cause color centers within the diamond to absorb green light, thereby creating a pink appearance. However, this theory is yet to receive widespread acceptance, and further research is required.

Another dimension to understanding the color origin in pink diamonds is through the examination of their lattice structure. It has been found that pink diamonds exhibit a more complex pattern known as "graining". This graining is thought to relate to the pink coloration, as the compressed lattice structure refracts light differently than colorless diamonds, resulting in the pink hue.

Additionally, while it's widely agreed that pink diamonds' color comes from a process called plastic deformation during their formation, the exact nature of this deformation is under debate. One recent hypothesis suggests that the pink coloration might be due to a specific type of plastic deformation that causes crystal twinning or duplication in the diamond's crystal structure.

== Properties determining value ==
The same four basic parameters that govern the grading of all gemstones are used to grade pink diamonds–the four Cs of connoisseurship: color, clarity, cut and carat weight. Color is considered the most important criterion in grading a pink diamond and determining its value. However, size is an important consideration as well. The larger a pink diamond, and the better its color, the more valuable it will be.

One of the most famous pink diamonds is the Pink Star — at 59.60-carats, this type IIa diamond is the largest vivid pink diamond in the world. In 2014, the auction buyer was unable to pay the promised sum and was subsequently forced to default on its purchase. Among famous pink diamonds, the Daria-i-Noor is the largest pink diamond in the world, estimated to weigh 182 carats; together with the Noor-ul-Ain, it is the oldest-known pink diamond, both belonging to the Iranian crown jewels.

=== Color ===
As with the color in all fancy color diamonds, the color in pink diamonds is assessed according to its hue, saturation, and tone. The hue refers to the primary and secondary colors, the saturation refers to the intensity of color, and the tone refers to the darkness of the color. Pink diamonds can occur in hues ranging from brown-pink to purple-pink, although pink can also be a modifying color in other diamond colors. Brown, orange, and purple are the only occurring secondary hues in pink diamonds although a pink diamond can exhibit both brown and orange overtones at the same time, making it a "brownish orangey pink" diamond. The ideal pink diamonds are generally considered to be those which exhibit pure pink color although purple-pink diamonds are generally very highly regarded as well. Generally speaking, a vivid pink diamond will be more valuable than a larger lighter pink diamond, although it is not always the case according to the Diamond Investment & Intelligence Center.

Pink diamonds can occur in eight intensities: faint pink, very light pink, light pink, fancy light pink, fancy pink, fancy intense pink, fancy vivid pink, fancy deep/dark pink. Just like in all fancy color diamonds, the more vivid intensity pink diamonds are far rarer than the less vivid, which is in part why they demand a higher price. The same cause in nature which is the course of the pink in pink diamonds can be more or less concentrated depending on the specimen. That is why it is so rare to find the most concentrated diamonds in each color. There is no perfect consensus as to what defines each color intensity grade, even though the GIA keeps a master catalog of each diamond color. Therefore, each color intensity also has a subscale of 1–10. Within the industry, a diamond trader may call a diamond "fancy vivid" or "fancy intense" but will often also call the diamond "a 7" or whichever number is most apropos to the diamond's appearance, which enables the most thorough representation of the diamond's color intensity.

Pink diamonds fall under the category of Type I or Type IIa diamonds. They tend to have an irregular shape.

The Argyle Diamond Mine, the world's current main source for pink diamonds, has developed its own pink diamond color classification system separate from that of the GIA. Instead of intensity, the color is divided into a scale from 1–9, 9 being the lightest and 1 being the darkest. However, some Argyle pink diamonds also receive GIA certificates.

=== Clarity ===
Most gem-quality diamonds are examined under a loupe to determine their clarity. This 10x magnification determines whether or not the diamond exhibits inclusions either on its surface or inside. Like all diamonds, pink diamond clarity is measured on a scale from Flawless to Included. Only 7% of pink diamonds are either Flawless or Internally Flawless (IF), and the majority are Slightly Included (SI). Like most of the colors of fancy color diamonds, the clarity has little effect on a pink diamond's value. Since pink diamonds are formed by a deformation on their lattice structure, their probability of a low clarity grade is higher, making high-clarity pink diamonds extremely rare (<7%).

=== Fluorescence ===
According to the GIA, more than 80% of pink diamonds display fluorescence.

== Lab grown diamonds ==
A "synthetic diamond", or "lab-grown" diamond, is chemically the same as a mined diamond, but it is manufactured rather than crystallizing naturally. Pink diamonds can be crystallized by using either the chemical vapor deposition method (CVD), or the high-pressure, high-temperature method. The pink color is often the result of post-growth treatment such as irradiation and annealing.

== Source mines ==
Pink diamonds have been found in all of the major diamond-producing nations, notably Australia, Brazil, Russia, South Africa and Tanzania. Pink diamonds were first discovered in India, in the Kollur mine in the Guntur district of Andhra Pradesh (which at the time was part of the Golconda kingdom), one of two of the earliest known diamonds are thought to have originated. Concurrently, and throughout the 17th and 18th centuries, pink diamonds were being discovered in the Minas Gerais region of Brazil. Pink diamonds are still occasionally found in the Golconda mine and in Brazil but approximately 80% of the world's pink diamonds originated from the Argyle Diamond Mine in Kimberley, Western Australia before it closed in 2020. Out of the mine's 20 million carat annual output, only 0.1% were classified as pink diamonds. After the diamonds are polished, the total carats of pink diamonds becomes smaller still.

== In popular culture ==
The earliest known pink diamonds are the Daria-i-noor and the Noor-ul-ain diamonds which are both part of the Iranian crown jewels.

A pink diamond called Pink Panther, the largest in the world, is the MacGuffin of the 1963 film of the same name.

In 2002, when Ben Affleck proposed to Jennifer Lopez with a 6.1-carat pink diamond engagement ring, it catapulted pink diamonds into the popular mindset, triggering an immense surge in pink diamond prices that still exists today.

An enormous pink diamond was one of the central focuses in the 2006 film Blood Diamond, surrounded by the depictions of conflict diamonds mined and sold to fund civil wars and diamond companies.

The popularity of pink diamonds rose in November 2013, when the 59.6-carat Pink Star diamond was bid on at auction in Geneva for $83 million by New York diamond cutter Isaac Wolf, then renamed the Pink Dream. Wolf ultimately defaulted, forcing auctioneer Sotheby's to pay the owners the promised sum.

On 3 April 2017, Sotheby's again auctioned the Pink Star, in Hong Kong, which sold to Chow Tai Fook Enterprises for a record US$71.2 million (553 million Hong Kong dollars, including fees).

Prior to Sotheby's Pink Star diamond sale, the record price paid for a pink diamond was held by the 16.08 carat Sweet Josephine Diamond, which had sold to Hong Kong billionaire Joseph Lau, in 2015, for $28.5 million. (One day later, he also purchased the 12.03 carat Blue Moon of Josephine Diamond for $48.5 million. Both diamonds were bought as gifts for his daughter, Josephine, born in 2008, as was the 7.03-carat Blue Moon diamond, which he renamed the Star of Josephine diamond, purchased in 2009 for $9.5 million.)

In November 2020, an extremely rare purple-pink Russian 14.8-carat diamond, called "Spirit of The Rose", sold at an auction in Switzerland for $26.6 million. It was the largest diamond ever auctioned because 99% of all pink diamonds are under 10 carats.

In February 2021, American rapper Lil Uzi Vert revealed that they had a 10-11 carat pink diamond implanted in their forehead. In June 2021, they removed the diamond from their forehead.

In July 2022, a mine in Angola yielded a pink diamond that is believed to be the largest discovered for 300 years, according to the Australian miner Lucapa Diamond Company. The stone, weighing 170 carat, has been named "Lulo Rose" after the Lulo alluvial diamond mine, where it was found.

== Notable examples ==
Pink Diamond	Notability
Daria-i-Noor	Believed to be the oldest diamond in the Iranian crown jewels
Noor-ul-Ain	Cut from the same 400 carat rough diamond as the Daria-i-Noor
The Williamson Pink Diamond	Discovered at the Williamson diamond mine in Mwadui, Tanzania, in 1947 by Canadian geologist Dr John Williamson who gave the uncut stone to Princess Elizabeth and Prince Philip upon their wedding in November 1947. The 54.5 carats (10.90 g) rough diamond was cut in London by Briefel and Lemer and set by Frederick Mew of Cartier as 23.6 carats (4.72 g) centre round-cut in a jonquil setting.
The Martian Pink	Originally owned by Harry Winston, sold at auction in 1976, the same year that the US sent a satellite to Mars
The Unique Pink	Most expensive fancy vivid pink diamond to ever sell at auction
The Pink Star	Originally owned by the Steinmetz Group and called the Steinmetz Pink, then sold and renamed the Pink Star, and sold again and renamed the Pink Dream.
The Hortensia Diamond	Belonged to the Crown Jewels of France and was worn by the Queen of Holland, Hortense de Beauharnais
The Graff Pink	Most expensive pink diamond price per carat ever paid at auction
Pink Legacy	Fancy vivid pink cut-cornered rectangular-cut diamond of 18.96 carats, purchased by Harry Winston in 2018, formerly owned by the Oppenheimer family.
The Condé Diamond	Gifted in 1643 by Louis XIII or XIV to the Prince of Condé, Louis de Bourbon
The Agra Diamond	Originally owned by Rajah of Gwalior's family, who later handed it over to Babur, the Moghul emperor, as a token of thanks for sparing their lives.
The Princie Diamond	Originally owned by the royal family of Hyderabad
Lulo Rose	Biggest pink diamond found in 300 years in Angola, at 170 carats

== See also ==
- Blue diamond
- Brown diamond
- Red diamond
- Diamonds as an investment
- List of diamonds
- List of minerals
