= Property developers in Hong Kong =

Developers and controversies in Hong Kong real estate

Since the British colonisation of Hong Kong in 1841 after the First Opium War, Hong Kong has grown from a stony outcrop on the southern coast of China to a territory whose property prices are among the highest in the world. The territory has a land mass of 1,111 km^{2} (429 mi^{2}). According to government figures as at 2018, most of the land in Hong Kong is woodland, shrubland and grassland – much of which designated as country parks such as Lion Rock, Plover Cove Country Park and Sai Kung East Country Park, and only approximately 25% of the land mass out of the total territory is classed as "built-up". Most of the 7.3 million people in Hong Kong inhabit an area measuring 78 km^{2} (30 mi^{2}). Excluding rural settlement housing, which represents 7% of the city's total domestic households, the remainder of the population is effectively squeezed into an area of 42 km^{2} (16 mi^{2}). Property developers play a direct role in housing in Hong Kong, including the hoarding of approximately 1,000 hectares (2,500 acres) of agricultural land which could otherwise be used for housing.

== Major developers in Hong Kong ==
Development in Hong Kong has historically been dominated by a cartel of five families, who now count themselves among the richest in the former colony. The developers share similar cost structures and advantages, and settle competition at land auctions by collusive bidding. Similarly, in residential sales, project metrics are equally predictable because the small circle of architects and banks means secrets are difficult to keep for long. They refrain from official price-cutting, although they may offer discounts, cash rebates or other inducements to the buying public. The orderly competition lowers operating risk and ensures lucrative returns.

Property developers are major landlords of residential, retail and office space in the territory, engaged in all aspects of property development, construction, property investment and management. Most hold sizeable construction land banks, such as Henderson Land, Sun Hung Kai Properties, New World Development and Cheung Kong, which hold between them over 10 square kilometres (3.9 mi^{2}) in the New Territories. Developers' returns have been reinvested into other business sectors such as utilities, which had the benefit of being stable and highly cash-generative, and often had significant real estate of their own. Leading conglomerate Cheung Kong Holdings, controlled by Li Ka-shing, is the foremost port operator, and also has significant retail presence within the territory in form of hotels, telecommunications, retail stores – supermarkets (ParknShop), home appliances (Fortress) and cosmetics chains (Watsons).

In recent years, Private equity real estate firms such as Gaw Capital and Phoenix Property Investors have also been increasing their holdings in Hong Kong real estate.

Sun Hung Kai is the largest real estate company in Hong Kong by market capitalisation. According to 2012 estimates by Barclays Capital, Sun Hung Kai, Cheung Kong and Henderson Land Development together provide an estimated 54 percent of the 20,398 private housing units to be launched in Hong Kong as at 2012.

Hong Kong-based consolidated turnover figures and reference periods in parentheses. ('Interim' indicates 6 months' figures)

- Sun Hung Kai Properties (HK$79,721 million – interim 2025)
- Cheung Kong Holdings and its listed subsidiary Hutchison Whampoa Property, both controlled by Li Ka-shing ($21,700 million – interim 2011) (Note: Notes to the accounts 2. Turnover and contribution)
- New World Development ($9,127.5 million – interim 2011) (Note: Revenues and segment information)
- Henderson Land Development, controlled by Lee Shau-kee ($9,919 million – interim 2011) (Note: Notes to the accounts 10. Segment reporting)
- Wheelock & Co. Its subsidiaries is The Wharf (Holdings) and Wheelock Properties, etc.
- MTR Corporation, controlled by the Government of Hong Kong ($3,103 million – interim 2011) (Note: Segmental information – Hong Kong station commercial activities $1,608 million; Hong Kong property rental and management $1,495 million, it recorded an additional $1,445 profit on property developments for the half year to June 2011)
- Kerry Properties ($2,344 million – interim 2011) (Note: Notes to the accounts 2. Principal activities and segmental analysis of operations)
- Sino Group ($5,761 million – interim 2011) (Note: Condensed Consolidated Income Statement – Consolidated turnover $5,761 million for the 6 months ended 31 December 2011)
- China Overseas Land and Investment Limited (HK$2,120 million – interim 2011) (Note: Chairman's statement: Business Review)
- Chinachem Group, controlled by the estate of Nina Wang
- Chinese Estates Group, controlled by Joseph Lau (HK$857.9 million – interim 2011) (Note: Operating segments)
- Emperor Group, controlled by Albert Yeung ($1,048 million – interim 2011) (Note: Condensed Consolidated Statement of Comprehensive Income – Consolidated turnover $1,048 million for the 6 months ended 30 September 2011)
- Great Eagle Holdings – mainly investment and hotel operations ($2,230 million – interim 2011) (Note: Condensed Consolidated Statement of Comprehensive Income. – Consolidated turnover $2,230 million for the 6 months ended 30 June 2011.) and its listed subsidiary Champion REIT
- Hang Lung Group, controlled by Ronnie Chan ($5,714 million – full year 2011) (Note: Notes to the accounts 3. Turnover and Segment Information)
- Hopewell Holdings, controlled by Gordon Wu ($587 million – interim 2011) (Note: Condensed Consolidated Statement of Comprehensive Income – Consolidated turnover $587 million for the 6 months ended 31 December 2011)
- Lai Sun Development, controlled by Peter Lam (HK$849.6 million – full year 2011) (Note: 4. Operating Segment Information)
- K. Wah International, controlled by Lui Che-woo ($682 million – interim 2011) (Note: Notes to the accounts 5. Segment information)
- Nan Fung Group controlled by Vivien Chen

=== Commercial property only ===
- Hongkong Land, controlled by Jardine Matheson ($9,547 million – full year 2011) (Note: Revenue (US$m) – Commercial revenue $804M; Residential revenue $420M)
- Swire Properties, subsidiary of Swire Pacific (undisclosed – interim 2011) (Note: Review of Operations; Property division world-wide turnover $4,836 million for the 6 months ended 30 June 2011)
- Hysan Development

== Representation ==
The leaders of the various development firms are public figures whose opinions are regularly solicited by the media. Real Estate Developers Association (REDA), the industry body representing the developers established in 1965, has had only 3 chairmen since its inception. It was headed by Stanley Ho for 25 years until he stepped down in 2011, to be replaced by former Swire Properties managing director, Keith Kerr. Four of the richest people in Hong Kong (with Raymond and Thomas Kwok of Sun Hung Kai counting as one) according to Forbes – Li Ka-shing (Cheung Kong), the Kwok brothers, Lee Shau-kee (Henderson Land Development), and Cheng Yu-tung (New World Development) – are vice chairmen.

According to an analysis by the South China Morning Post, 12 major property conglomerates directly speak for at least 64 seats on the 1,200-member committee that selects the Chief executive. Through interests other than property, they have influence on many more seats, such as transportation.

Developers' interests are represented in LegCo in a functional constituency seat for the real estate and construction sub-sector. Abraham Razack has occupied the seat since his first election in 2000; he has since been elected unopposed four times.

== Public perception and policy failure ==
Historically, there has been public perception that the government maintains a high land price policy in order to economically benefit from it.

In a study commissioned by REDA in 2010, some 90 percent of property-buyers had an average, negative or very negative impression of the property tycoons. Those surveyed were unable to identify what the association did best, and their main criticisms were a lack of transparency coupled with a perceived closeness to the government. Scholars note the drastic change in land use policies of the government since the early years of Tung Chee-hwa's administration: namely, a scaled back provision of public housing and an increase in land supply to the private sector. These measures had the effect of creating shortage and in driving up housing prices significantly since the SARS crisis in 2003.

An editorial in Ming Pao said: "Though developers have used controversial marketing gimmicks, the government has rarely exercised its powers to protect consumers. Citizens disapprove of developers. Many are convinced that some government policies are excessively favourable to them. That is why the generality of citizens have the impression that the government colludes with businesses." In addition to various misleading and opaque sales practices, the widening wealth gap and housing prices beyond the reach of everyday residents have become core livelihood issues. According to BusinessWeek, property prices in Hong Kong have tripled and median monthly household incomes have stagnated at around HK$20,000 (US$2,580) since 1997. The vicar-general of the Catholic diocese demonised Li Ka-shing for his policies, comparing him to the devil. Suffering criticisms of opacity, the association engaged Ogilvy Public Relations, at whose behest a website was launched in July 2011.

According to an opinion poll published in August 2011 by the Chinese University of Hong Kong, two-thirds of those interviewed thought developers cared only about making money and nothing about social responsibility. Although Chief Secretary Henry Tang claimed in May 2011 that there was no such thing as "property hegemony" – the alleged dominance of developers over local politics and the economy — 78 percent of those polled agreed it existed in Hong Kong. Half of those questioned believed the government could still restrain the developers' power and influence through control of the supply of land and housing. Roughly one-third strongly agreed that developers had contributed to the city's economic prosperity, 30 per cent 'fairly agreed', and another 30 per cent disagreed; 44 per cent thought developers had the most control over property prices, with the government scoring 23 percent.

REDA has consistently lobbied against government regulation in the property sector. Nevertheless, the political influence they wield has been the source of disharmony within Hong Kong society. Public discontent has escalated to hatred of the property tycoons. Markus, grand nephew of Run Run Shaw observed: "Until recently, crony capitalism was a conspiracy theory ... Now with what's happened with Donald Tsang and his relationship with these businessmen, the conspiracy theory has been revealed to be true." During the final years his administration, Tsang became the focus of controversy over pecuniary benefits he allegedly received from property tycoons, such as a trip to Phuket on a private jet allegedly owned by Cheung Chung-kiu, a billionaire businessman from Chongqing; transport to Hong Kong from Macau aboard a $19 million yacht owned by Thomas Lau. Rafael Hui, Chief Secretary appointed by Tsang, also came under investigation by the ICAC, and was convicted in late 2014 along with several principals in the property industry in a landmark corruption case. This event led some to suspect that Tsang intentionally repressed longer-term strategic development policies for fear of upsetting the developers' cartel.

During the 2019–20 Hong Kong protests, Chinese state-run press agency Xinhua attributed the social unrest to the unaffordability of housing, and blamed vested interests for "maximis[ing] gains by obstructing the government in its bid to boost land supply, or raising the price of the land they hoarded, or by changing the land use". A commentary in People's Daily urged: "For the sake of public interest … it is time developers show their utmost sincerity instead of minding their own business, hoarding land for profit and earning the last penny".

== Government land sales ==
The government of Hong Kong has a monopoly on land supply, and it is heavily reliant on revenue derived from property. The government, under British colonial rule, created a system for land use based on grants of leases. Any redevelopment of properties under existing leases would be subject to negotiations to determine a new lease and pay the difference in market value between the two uses in the form of a "land premium". The government therefore had an interest in maintaining high land price to keep taxes low. Land premiums amounted to HK$65.5 billion ($8.4 billion) in the 2010–2011 financial year, making up 17.4 percent of receipts; stamp duty from property sales made up another 6.5 percent, meaning 24 percent of government income came from property deals. The capital-intensive nature of the practice of land premiums means that the well-capitalised and established players in the industry are favoured. It has been speculated that civil servants from the Lands department have incentive to offer deals amenable to major developers, as many find ready employment and also professional afterlife with the major developers.

Government sought to protect revenues by setting a minimum price at land auctions after the 1997 Asian financial crisis. This policy has been criticised by economist Andy Xie, who believes that land supply should be adjusted according to development needs of the local economy, and not to achieve target prices for the land. He further states that the policy, backed by loose money from the banking sector, has caused the economy to restructure around the government-mandated land price.

== Consumer complaints and protection ==
Hong Kong, which has been ranked by the US conservative Heritage Foundation as 'World's Freest Economy' in their Index of Economic Freedom for 15 consecutive years, has a strong consumer culture but a weak culture of consumer protection. Even the Consumer Council, the only body whose role is to protect consumers, has no investigative or disciplinary authority; furthermore, it has never reported on developers and property sales. According to corporate governance activist David Webb, "the fact that we keep winning the freest economy in the world is only because there aren't measures of the freedom of the domestic economy."

== Controversies – deceptive practices ==
Over the years, there have been a number of controversies involving regulatory lapses and conflicts of interest in the sector.

The New York Times noted that Hong Kong has had many controversies over whether developers have overstated the square footage of apartments and the value per square foot of property transactions, for example, how to count terraces, common areas and other features.

=== Supply manipulation ===
Developers have been long criticised for hoarding flats and otherwise deliberately withholding completed flats for later sale. Hang Lung Properties, having completed The Long Beach estate in Tai Kok Tsui in 2005, still had unsold units on hand 2018; similarly, in The Cullinan, a high-end development in West Kowloon which was introduced in 2007, the developer was still holding 60 of the most luxurious units in the project's two towers more than a decade later, for revenue maximisation in a perpetually rising market. In mid-June 2018, developers had unsold stock of more than 9,000 new flats according to government data, some of which had been held for more than a decade.

As property prices continued to rise, and the housing situation became critical in the 2010s, the government came under pressure to act to increase housing supply. Pointing to data that the number of unsold units in completed projects had been on the rise, the government introduced measures to stop developers from hoarding flats. In 2018, the government proposed a vacancy tax that targets all newly completed flats remaining unoccupied for six months in a year. Flats are deemed finished one year after the developer obtains an occupation permit, from which time the proposed tax would be levied equivalent to two years of ratable value.

=== Gross floor area calculation ===
Property sales are usually quoted on prices of built property based on "gross floor area". However, there is no uniform definition of this term in sales documents, nor is there any statute governing such measures. According to the Hong Kong Institute of Surveyors, there has been a wide variation of prices from one project to another. The general lack of comparability of sales prices for buyers and end-users due to developers being free to include all sorts of different common areas into price calculation. Unlike measures in other jurisdictions, such as British Columbia, the "gross floor area" is based on a floor area that includes balconies and verandas and a percentage of all common areas; in other words, buyers pay for 30–35 percent of uninhabitable floor space. Hong Kong property buyers thus commonly accept that the usable space of a residential unit is only 65–70 percent of its gross floor area - this is known as the Efficiency Ratio. This ratio stood at 93 percent thirty years previously. On April 29, 2013, the Residential Properties (First-hand Sales) Ordinance practice came into effect, banning the term "gross floor area" in advertising flats in new developments; developers must henceforth specify the size of flats in terms of "saleable area" – the usable space within the flat – in sales brochures for new residential projects.

=== Off-site show flats ===
In the absence of strict rules for building authorities to regulate the designs of show flats, developers have been accused of misleading buyers by creating deceptive units to market their products. These are often located off-site, inside shopping malls, and the only requirement is to conform to rudimentary fire regulations. According to The Standard, developers use glass walls, deliberately undersized furniture, missing doors, and ceilings that are higher than specifications to falsely create the impression of spaciousness. REDA asserted its members' show flats are accurate representations, and denied there was need for regulation.

=== Hyping The Arch ===
Sun Hung Kai Properties was criticised for its sales tactics at its The Arch development in West Kowloon in 2005. The company was accused of the practice of "internal sales" of uncompleted units, the absence of sale price-lists, and also for hyping sales for flats in The Arch by announcing inflated prices (per square metre) achieved. A buyer apparently paid HK$168 million, or HK$31,300 per square foot, for a 5,360-square-foot (498 m^{2}) penthouse. Discounts on additional units bought by the same purchaser were allegedly given, but were excluded from the calculation. This allowed SHK to raise prices of the next batch of 500 units by 5–10 percent; SHKP has denied the allegations.

=== Down-payment opacity ===
Retail price lists are frequently not available, or appear after the event. At the pre-sale of two housing developments, 'Park Island' and 'Le Point', buyers were told by developers, Sun Hung Kai and Cheung Kong respectively, to make down-payment of HK$50,000 (US$6,430) without the benefit of any sales brochure or price list. This tactic was exploited to help hype sales by creating false impressions of a development project's popularity and prices. In the aftermath of complaints, the government, the Consumer Council, the Real Estate Developers’ Association and the Estate Agents’ Authority (EAA) negotiated a closed-door agreement where the EAA issued set of revised sales guidelines, while the developers escaped sanction.

=== Floor-numbering controversy ===
In 2009 the developers' numbering plan for floor levels of 39 Conduit Road, where 42 intermediate floor numbers were dropped, and the 46th floor penthouse was boldly renumbered "88th floor", stirred controversy. The Consumer Council recognised the accepted common practice of skipping the 13th and 14th floors, but suggested that developers' "imaginary heights [be] brought back to earth."

=== Related-party sales controversy ===
New World Development was involved in controversy when allegedly sold 39 flats at The Masterpiece in Tsim Sha Tsui to business associates before the public sale in August 2010 to create an illusion of keen interest. This prompted the government to urge developers to establish a disclosure mechanism on sales of residential property to related parties.

== Corruption scandals ==
=== Leung Chin-man controversy ===
In August 2008, there was furore over the appointment of the former Permanent Secretary for Housing, Planning and Lands, Leung Chin-man, to deputy managing director and executive director of New World China Land Ltd.

In 2004, while Leung was Director of Housing, the government had sold Hung Hom Peninsula, an unused Private Sector Participation Scheme project, at less than half of the original asking price. There was widespread suspicion among members of the public that job offer was a quid pro quo for the favours he allegedly granted to its parent company, New World Development (NWD), in 2004.

=== Sun Hung Kai /Rafael Hui corruption trial ===
SHK Executive Director Thomas Chan was arrested by the Independent Commission Against Corruption (ICAC) on 19 March 2013. Eight further people linked to the company were taken into police custody in the afternoon on 29 March 2012. Co-chairmen Thomas and Raymond Kwok and five others were arrested by the ICAC on allegations of corruption. Rafael Hui, former chief secretary, was also taken in for questioning and later released on bail. The probe caused a 15 percent fall in the company's share price, and a downgrading of the company's outlook.

In December 2014, the jury convicted Thomas Kwok and Rafael Hui of the HK$8,500,000 bribery, and Hui was convicted of four more charges relating to misconduct in public office. The jury acquitted Raymond Kwok from all changes.

== Legislative measures ==
=== Targeted measures ===
In line with free market principles, the government has largely relied on industry self-regulation, which has been problematic: the government's role as the main supplier of building land in the territory has brought with it accusations of collusion and conflicts of interest. In 1995, following three years of deliberation, the Law Reform Commission (LRC) published a report with its recommendations on how developers must describe flats for sale, and adopt standardised methods for calculating living space, but it was not until 2010 when, after protracted discussions with REDA and developers, the Tsang administration decided to break the impasse. The government announced in October 2010 that it would set up a 14-member committee to consider direct legislation to regulate property transactions in the primary market, and to make recommendations within a year.

In March 2012, following a two-month public consultation during which a clear consensus emerged for legislation as soon as possible to deal with deceptive sales practices, the government tabled the Residential Properties (First-hand Sales) Bill that includes a raft of measures aimed at increasing transparency of property transactions, covering show flats, promotional brochures, how flat sizes are defined, and the required timing of the release of data about prices and transactions. The proposed legislation would oblige property developers to cite prices for new properties to use "saleable floor area" as the sole measurement in quoting the size of a property and the price per square foot in all sales-related documents, including advertisements. The measure is backed by maximum penalty for breach of HK$5 million, and up to seven years' imprisonment. Under the proposed legislation, developers may be subject to a fine of up to HK$500,000 if where deposits are taken from flat buyers before price lists are published.

REDA objected the legislation on the grounds that "contravened the protection of the right of private ownership and disposal of property stipulated in the Basic Law." They also argued banning the use of the GFA measure was denial their constitutional right to freedom of expression, and hinted at the possibility of a constitutional challenge. They also complained of the unfairness of allowing GFA for secondary home but not for selling first-hand properties. REDA argued to be allowed to include GFA "as a reference". Housing Secretary Eva Cheng said "Having a unified definition to calculate the area of a unit is the basis for the legislation ... But it is ridiculous to have some parts of the price list as references, while the real information is stated already." In op-ed in the South China Morning Post, Alex Lo welcomed the measures and criticised the REDA's arrogance, saying "People who enjoy too much power and privilege rarely know when to stop."
