= GYL =

GYL may refer to:

- Argyle Airport, in Western Australia
- Gayil language
- Gyldendal Norsk Forlag, a Norwegian publisher, stock symbol
