= Argyle Library Egg =

Australian piece of decorative art

The Argyle Library Egg (also known as the Argyle Library Egg by Kutchinsky) is a jewelled egg composed of gold and diamonds. Designed and completed in 1990 by Paul Kutchinsky with a commission by Argyle Diamonds of Perth, Australia, its design was inspired by the ornate Fabergé eggs that noted jeweller Peter Carl Fabergé created for the Russian royal family in the late 19th and early 20th centuries.

== Craftsmanship ==
Standing more than 2 feet (61 cm) tall, the egg is fashioned from 33 pounds (15 kg) of 18-carat gold sheets and is studded with 24,000 pink diamonds. Six master craftsmen labored a combined 7,000 hours over ten months to create the egg. Reportedly, Paul Kutchinsky hand-selected each diamond used in the design. Various figures had been suggested for the completed egg's value, including £7 million and A$16 million. It was sold for ¥800m (about £4.3m) in 2002.

== Surprise ==
Paying homage to Faberge's tradition of hiding a "surprise" inside each of his eggs, the Argyle Library Egg was designed to open and reveal a rotating miniature library and portrait gallery. The egg had a complex electronic mechanism to pull back the shell and rotate the interior for display. However, this mechanism reportedly experienced technical problems after the completed egg began a world tour in 1990. The portrait gallery, containing five enameled frames, was based upon a design that Fabergé produced for the Russian tsars.

== Exhibition and ownership ==
The finished egg was unveiled in April 1990 by Kutchinsky, who then exhibited the work around the world, including at a 1990 showcase of British craftsmanship at the Victoria and Albert Museum, London, and the Melbourne Cup, Australia, the same year, while looking for a buyer. The 1991 edition of the Guinness Book of World Records named the work as "the largest and most elaborate 'Easter Egg'".

After failing to find a buyer for the egg and with the onset of the 1990–91 Gulf War, which made its purchase by any oil-rich magnate from the Middle East unlikely, Kutchinsky faced financial difficulties. Among those he had approached was Donald Trump, whom Kutchinsky believed would be drawn to the egg's lavish use of gold, but that sale did not materialize. Possession of the egg then reverted to Argyle Mining, who used the egg as a showpiece to promote its diamonds. In 1992, it went on display as the centrepiece of the Australian Pavilion at the 1992 Universal Exposition in Seville, Spain. Eventually, the company sold the egg to a private collector, after which its whereabouts were unknown for many years. In 2013, Kutchinsky's daughter, the journalist Serena Kutchinsky, reported that the egg had been bought from Argyle for ¥800m (about £4.3m) by Kenichi Mabuchi, a Japanese businessman in Tokyo, who displayed the egg in his chateau's foyer. Kenichi's son Takashi, an expert engineer, partially dismantled the egg to replace and modify the constantly malfunctioning motor. After Kenichi's death, his family donated the egg to the National Museum of Nature and Science in Tokyo. Serena wrote a book about the egg, published in 2026, titled Kutchinsky's Egg: A Family's Story of Obsession, Love, and Loss.

== See also ==
- Egg decorating
