= Argyle diamond mine =

Former diamond mine in Western Australia

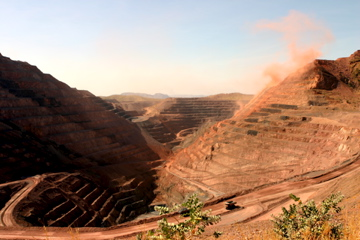
- The open pit of the Argyle diamond mine. A large mining truck is visible on the road for scale.

- Location in Australia
- Location: Lake Argyle, Western Australia, Australia; 16°42′44″S 128°23′51″E
- Products: Diamonds
- Opened: 1985
- Closed: 2020
- Company: Rio Tinto
- Website: www.argylediamonds.com.au

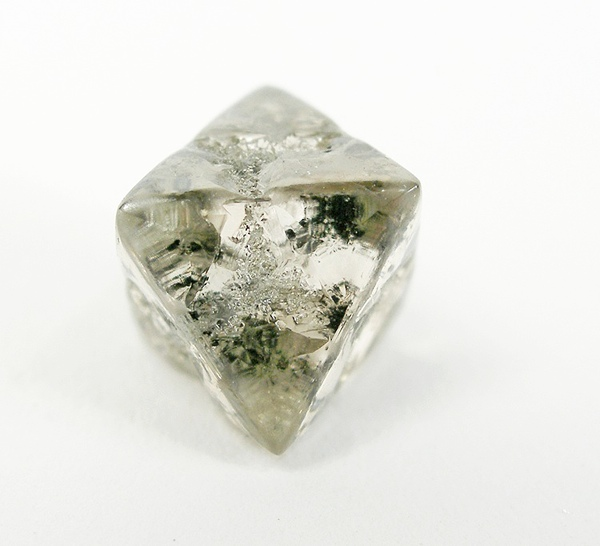
Uncut diamond crystal from the Argyle mine, 4.27 carats

The Argyle Diamond Mine was a diamond mine located in the East Kimberley region in the remote north of Western Australia. Argyle was at times the largest diamond producer in the world by volume (14 million carats in 2018), although the proportion of gem-quality diamonds was low. It was the only known significant source of pink and red diamonds (producing over 90% of the world's supply), and additionally provided a large proportion of other naturally coloured diamonds, including champagne, cognac and rare blue diamonds.

Mining operations ceased in November 2020, after 37 years of operations and producing more than 865 million carats of rough diamonds. Mine operator Rio Tinto plans to decommission the mine and rehabilitate the site at least through 2025.

The Argyle diamond mine is also notable for being the first successful commercial diamond mine exploiting a volcanic pipe of lamproite, rather than the more usual kimberlite pipe; much earlier attempts to mine diamonds from a lamproite pipe in Arkansas, United States, were commercially unsuccessful. The mine is owned by Rio Tinto that also owns the Diavik Diamond Mine in Canada and the Murowa Diamond Mine in Zimbabwe.

== Description ==
The mine site covers about 50 ha (124 acres), stretching in a mostly linear shape about 1,600 m (5,200 ft) long and 150 to 600 m (490 to 1,970 ft) wide. Argyle originally used open-pit techniques, reaching about 600 m deep at its deepest point. The open cut closed in 2010, and operations became fully underground in 2013 via block cave mining.

=== Location ===
The Argyle diamond mine is located in the Kimberley region in the far northeast of the Australian state of Western Australia. It is located to the south-west of Lake Argyle in the Matsu Ranges, about 550 km (340 mi) south-west of Darwin. Because it is 185 km (115 mi) by road from the nearest settlement (Kununurra), a complete residential camp was constructed on site. Most of the 520 workers commuted from Perth, over 2,000 km (1,200 mi) away, for alternating two-week shifts at the mine. The mine encouraged local employment and had a large number of indigenous local people working within the mine.

== History ==
Small quantities of alluvially deposited diamonds have been known in Australia since the late 19th century, first found by prospectors searching for gold. However, no source volcanic pipe deposit was apparent. Following the discovery of several alluvial diamonds in the West Kimberley region along the Lennard River (Ellendale area) in 1969 a systematic search of Western Australia for the source of these diamonds was begun by a consortium of mining companies, collectively known as the Kalumburu Joint Venture. Tanganyika Holdings, part of the Kalumburu Joint Venture (later to become the Ashton Joint Venture) had employed Maureen Muggeridge. In 1979, Muggeridge discovered diamond samples in the floodplain of a small creek that flowed in Lake Argyle. She soon traced the source of the diamonds to the headwaters of Smoke Creek. On 2 October 1979, the Argyle pipe was discovered.

Over the following three years, the deposit was assessed for economic viability, and in 1983 the decision was made to commence mining operations. Alluvial mining operations commenced immediately, while the open-pit mine was constructed over a period of 18 months at a cost of A$450 million. The mine was commissioned in December 1985.

== Geology ==
The mine was the first successful commercial non alluvial diamond mine not located on a kimberlite pipe. The pipe is named "AK-1", although it is commonly simply called the "Argyle pipe".

The volcanic pipe is a diatreme, composed of olivine lamproite, present as tuff and lava. Peripheral volcanic facies suggest the lamproite eruption formed a maar. At the margins of the volcanic pipe the lamproite is mixed with a volcanic breccia containing shattered wall rock fragments mixed and milled by the eruption. Minerals in the marginal facies include zeolite minerals, micas, kaolinite and clays, typical of post-eruption hydrothermal circulation.

Diamonds were found within the intact core of the volcanic pipe, as well as within some of the marginal breccia facies and maar facies. However, some diamonds are considered to have been resorbed during the post-eruption cooling of the pipe and converted to graphite.

The diatreme pipe formed by explosive eruption of the lamproite magma through a zone of weakness in the continental crust.

The diamonds found at the Argyle pipe have been dated to about 1.58 billion years of age, while the volcano which created the pipe is aged between 1.1 and 1.2 billion years old. This represents a relatively short period during which diamond formation could have taken place (around 400 million years), which may explain the small average size and unusual physical characteristics of Argyle diamonds. Diamonds found in the Argyle pipe are predominantly eclogitic, meaning that the carbon is of organic origin (see Natural history of diamonds).

In addition to the pipe itself, a number of semi-permanent streams have eroded away portions of the pipe and created significant alluvial deposits of diamonds. These deposits were also actively mined.

== Production ==
Logo

Argyle was the fourth-largest diamond-producing mine in the world by volume, averaging annual production of 8 million carats (1,600 kg). Production peaked in 1994, when 42 million carats (8,400 kg) were produced. Argyle's open pit mine produced over 750 million carats (150,000 kg) of rough diamonds.

Most of Argyle's gem-quality production was in brown diamond. These diamonds are usually difficult to sell, although Rio Tinto has seen some success in a decade-long marketing campaign to promote brown diamonds as champagne and cognac toned. In contrast, the company has no problems selling diamonds in pink, purple and red tones, which are very rare and in high demand, therefore commanding premium prices. The pink diamonds were processed and sold as polished diamonds by a specialised team based in Perth to customers worldwide.

The mine had ore processing and diamond sorting facilities on site. Once diamonds were removed from the ore and acid washed, they were sorted and shipped to Perth for further sorting and sale. A significant quantity of diamonds were cut in India, where low costs of labour allowed small diamonds to be cut for a profit; this was especially relevant to the Argyle mine, which on average produced smaller rough diamonds than other mines.

=== Diamond characteristics ===
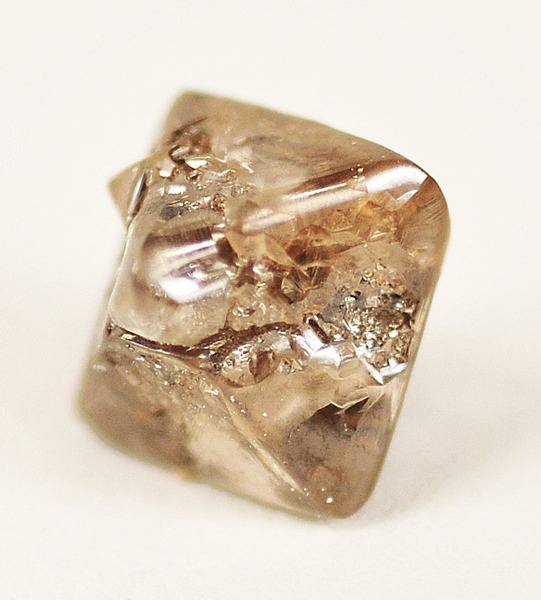
A large brown Argyle diamond, 3.6 carats

The diamonds produced at the Argyle diamond mine were of an average low quality. Only 5% of mined diamonds were of gem quality, compared to a worldwide average of 20%. (Author Janine Roberts contends that the "near-gem quality" rating is subjective and misleading because these diamonds can be cut into gems if desired.) The remaining 95% are about evenly split between classifications of "near-gem quality" and industrial grade; 80% of Argyle diamonds are brown, followed by 16% yellow, 2% white, 2% grey, and less than 1% pink and green. Despite the low production volume of pink and red diamonds, the Argyle mine was the only reliable source in the world, producing 90 to 95% of all pink and red diamonds. Most Argyle diamonds are classified as type 1a (see material properties of diamond), and have low levels of nitrogen impurities, their colour resulting instead from structural defects of the crystal lattice. Argyle diamonds tend to fluoresce blue or dull green under ultraviolet light, and blue-white under X-ray radiation. The most common inclusion is unconverted graphite, followed by crystalline inclusions of orange garnet, pyroxene, and olivine.

==== Annual Diamond Tender ====
Each year from 1984 to 2021, a small collection of the best pink diamonds was offered in an exclusive, invitation-only, sale known as the Argyle Pink Diamond Tender. For every 1 million carats (200 kg) of rough pink diamonds produced by the mine, only 1 carat (0.20 g) polished was offered for sale at the tender. In March 2009, Argyle announced their first tender of rare blue diamonds. The "Once in a Blue Moon" collection was sourced over several years, and comprised a range of precious blue and violet diamonds, which weighed in total 287 carats (57.4 g).

In 2016, the tender became the highest-selling tender in its 20-year history, according to the Diamond Investment & Intelligence Center. In conjunction with the mine's closure, the 2020 tender set further records, as it was the second last such sale. Following the closure, the final tender in 2021 delivered more record breaking results.

=== Reserves ===
Initial proven reserves of the Argyle mine were 61 million tonnes of ore, with an average ore grade of 6.8 carats (1.36 g) per ore tonne, about 400 million carats (80,000 kg). Further estimated reserves of 14 million tonnes of ore, at a grade of 6.1 carats (1.22 g) per tonne (85 million carats, 17,000 kg), also existed. As of 2001, reserves and resources in the open-pit-mined area contain 220 million tonnes of 2.5- to 3.0-carat-per-tonne (500 to 600 mg) graded ore, sufficient to sustain current production rates until 2007. The ore grades at the Argyle mine are unusually high, with most commercial diamond mines averaging grades of 0.3 to 1.0 carat (60 to 200 mg) per metric ton. Alluvial deposits of diamonds are believed to have been exhausted.

In 1989–1990, drill samples were taken from over 300 m below the floor of the pit. At the end of 1989 around 238 million tons of ore, with an estimated grade of 3.7 carats per ton were quoted as a resource. Much of this resource was below the open pit and was the subject of an underground mining study carried out in the mid-1990s.

In the late 1990s, part of the west wall of the open pit mine, containing 25 million tonnes of waste rock, began to collapse. In 1998, the decision was made to remove or "cut back" the unstable part of the west wall which freed up further economic ore in the south part of the open pit. This cut back cost around $100 million.

Argyle announced on 2 March 2018 that its estimated Ore Reserves decreased by 13 million tonnes to just 16 million tonnes. They mined 5 million tonnes in 2017. A more conservative view on future production performance and grades could bring forward the economic shut-off criteria.

An exploration decline was constructed at a cost of A$70 million to evaluate the economics of mining diamonds from the diamondiferous pipes below the floor of the open pit; these reserves would be mined underground (by block caving), rather than the open-pit method used up to then. In late 2005, Rio Tinto concluded that the operation was economically feasible. Pre-production construction of the underground mine commenced in early to mid-2006.

=== Economics ===
The Argyle diamond mine was economically feasible because its large reserves and high-grade ore offset a low average diamond value. The estimated value of Argyle diamond production was only US$7 per carat ($35/g); this compared to values of $70 per carat ($350/g) for diamonds produced at the Diavik mine and US$170 per carat ($850/g) at the Ekati mine, both in Canada. However, Argyle had two to four times the concentration of diamonds (ore grade) of these mines. This made extraction economically feasible, as mine costs are mostly related to the amount of ore processed, not the amount of diamond extracted.

=== Underground expansion ===
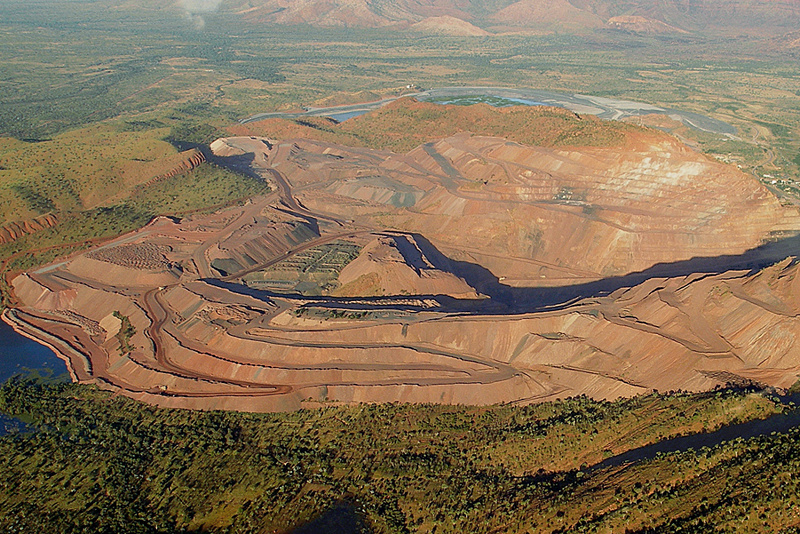
Aerial view of the open pit in 2007

In 2005, Rio Tinto was given the go-ahead to a future expansion project, moving it from an open pit to an underground mine. This plan was postponed; in September 2010 Rio Tinto announced fresh plans to develop an underground mine beneath the existing pit, increasing annual production to 9 million tonnes of ore. The project was completed by 2013, however with more expensive operations to run deeper mining, the mining costs soon began to outweigh the diamond yield.

== Closure ==
Following an announcement in 2018 that it was no longer economically viable, the mine stopped production on 3 November 2020 after producing approximately 865 million carats with remaining ores processed for the next six months followed by a decade of restoration in conjunction with the traditional owners of the lands. Sales of the final diamonds mined continued into 2022 in both Australia and the United States.

== See also ==
- Argyle Pink Jubilee
- Argyle Airport
- Argyle Library Egg
