= Condé (diamond) =

9.01 carat pink diamond

- Weight: 9.01 carats (1.802 g)
- Color: Fancy Pink
- Cut: Pear
- Country of origin: India
- Discovered: Unknown
- Cut by: Unknown
- Original owner: Jean-Baptiste Tavernier
- Owner: French government
- Estimated value: Unknown

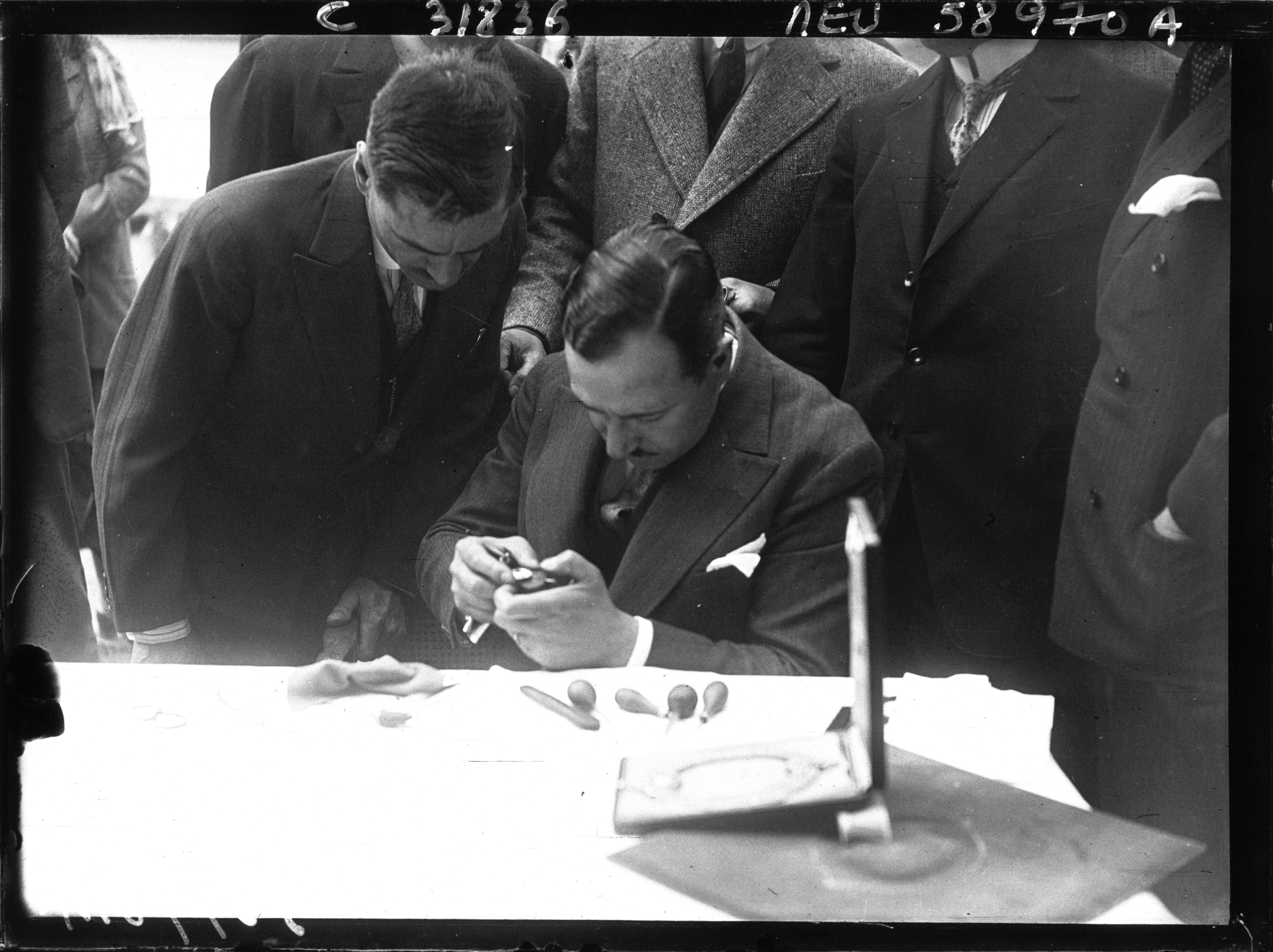
Examining "le grand Condé" in 1928.

The Condé diamond, also known as the Grand Condé or Pink Condé, is a 9.01 carat (1.802 g), pear cut, pink diamond.

Of Indian origins, the first known owner is Jean-Baptiste Tavernier, merchant and traveler, who sold it to King Louis XIII of France. The king or his heir, Louis XIV, then gave it to Louis II de Bourbon, prince of Condé known as Le Grand Condé (the diamond take its name by him), as a reward for his services during the Thirty Years' War.

It remained in the possession of the Condé family until 1892, when the last heir, the Duke of Aumale, ceded it to the French government on condition that it remained on display at the Château de Chantilly. Stolen in 1926 and later recovered, it is now exhibited, with other historical gems, in the Condé Museum, housed in the Castle itself.
