= Chinese Estates Group =

Hong Kong real estate development group

- Company type: Real estate
- Industry: Real estate
- Founded: 1986
- Headquarters: Hong Kong
- Key people: Joseph Lau (Chairman & )
- Products: offices and retail
- Revenue: HK$ 2,151.3 million (2009)
- Operating income: net_income = homepage =

Chinese Estates Group is a real estate development group based in Hong Kong. The group comprises three Hong Kong publicly listed companies : Chinese Estates Holdings Limited (Stock Code: 127), Chi Cheung Investment Company, Limited (Stock Code: 112) and G-Prop (Holdings) Limited (Stock Code: 286).

Historically, Chinese Estates Group has been focused on the Hong Kong market, but has more recently expanded into neighbouring Macau and mainland China.

In July 2010 the group was reported to be in exclusive negotiations to acquire Tower 42, an office tower in the City of London, for a reported sum of around £300 million.

== Operations ==
Total revenues for 2009 totalled HK$2,151.3 million. As of 31 December 2009 the property portfolio was valued at HK$8,564.3 million. The current portfolio comprises retail and office assets totalling around 1,000,000 square feet (93,000 m^{2}) and 1,200,000 square feet (110,000 m^{2}) respectively. The group also has a landbank of approximately 30,000,000 square feet (2,800,000 m^{2}) to be developed in Hong Kong, Macau, and in mainland China.
