= Argyle Pink Jubilee =

Pink diamond discovered in Australia

- Weight: 8.01 carats (1.602 g)
- Color: light pink
- Cut: rough
- Country of origin: Australia
- Mine of origin: Argyle diamond mine
- Discovered: August 2011
- Cut by: Richard How Kim Kam
- Original owner: Rio Tinto Group
- Owner: Museum Victoria

The Argyle Pink Jubilee is a rough pink diamond and the largest rough pink diamond unearthed in Australia. It was found at the Rio Tinto Argyle diamond mine in Western Australia.

Large stones like the Jubilee typically go to museums or end up at high-profile auction houses like Christie's. Christie's has only auctioned 18 polished pink diamonds larger than 10 carats in its 244-year history. The Jubilee was expected to tour internationally before sold at an invitation-only tender.

Originally weighing 12.76 carats (2.552 g), the light pink diamond started its cut in Perth in February 2012 by Richard How Kim Kam. While being cut, the diamond was found to have "one major internal fault line that could not be overcome." After it was only roughly formed and polished, and down to 8.01 carats (1.602 g), the diamond was donated to the Melbourne Museum.

== See also ==
- List of diamonds
