= Blue Moon of Josephine =

Blue diamond, sold for record price in November 2015

- Weight: 12.03 carats (2.406 g)
- Color: Fancy Vivid Blue
- Cut: Cushion-Shaped
- Owner: Joseph Lau
- Estimated value: US $48.4 million

The Blue Moon of Josephine is a 12.03 carats (2.406 g) blue diamond, described as flawless by experts, that was discovered in South Africa in January 2014 and was sold at a Sotheby's auction in Geneva in November 2015 at a record-setting price of $48.4 million (43.2 million Swiss francs plus fees). The diamond is the largest cushion-shaped blue stone classified as "fancy vivid" ever to appear at auction.

The "Blue Moon" sale, according to David Bennett, the head of Sotheby's international jewellery division, set a record for the highest-ever price per carat and it made the diamond both the most expensive jewel ever sold at auction and the world's most expensive diamond, regardless of color.

The diamond was bought by the Hong Kong billionaire, and fugitive convicted felon, Joseph Lau Luen-hung, who named it for his seven-year-old daughter, Josephine. On the day before the "Blue Moon" sale, Lau had purchased a 16.08 carats (3.216 g) pink diamond at a Christie's auction for $28.5 million, a record price for a jewel of its kind, and renamed it the "Sweet Josephine" diamond. In 2009, Lau bought another blue diamond for $9.5 million that he renamed the "Star of Josephine". The seller was Ehud Arye Laniado, a diamond trader.

The diamond exhibits red phosphorescence when observed under ultraviolet light.

== See also ==
- List of diamonds

The diamond was expertly conceived and meticulously analyzed from rough to polished by George Togholian, formerly of Cora International.
