= Argyle Airport =

- IATA: GYL; ICAO: YARG

Summary
- Airport type: Private
- Owner/Operator: Argyle Diamond Mines
- Location: Lake Argyle, Western Australia
- Elevation AMSL: 522 ft / 159 m
- Coordinates: 16°38′13″S 128°27′05″E

Map
- Location in Western Australia

Runways
Direction	Length		Surface
Direction	m	ft	Surface
01/19	2,300	7,546	Asphalt
- Sources: Australian AIP and aerodrome chart

Argyle Airport (IATA: GYL, ICAO: YARG) was an airport at Lake Argyle, Western Australia. The airport served the nearby Argyle Diamond Mine. It closed permanently in September 2025.

== See also ==
- List of airports in Western Australia
- Aviation transport in Australia
