= Community Care Fund =

Charitable trust fund in Hong Kong

- 關愛基金
- Formation: 2011
- Legal status: Charitable trust fund
- Purpose: Humanitarian
- Region served: Hong Kong
- Services: Financial support
- Methods: One-time grants

Community Care Fund (關愛基金) is a charitable trust fund which collects five billion dollars from the government and the business sector respectively. The purpose is to provide a wide variety of financial support which are excluded in Comprehensive Social Security Assistance for the poor.

It was suggested by Donald Tsang Yum-kuen, who was the Chief Executive of Hong Kong from 2005 to 2012, in the 2011 Policy address of Hong Kong. The Finance Committee discussed about contributing five billions to the Community Care Fund on 13 May 2011 and it was passed with twenty seven votes agreeing, six votes disagreeing and twelve votes abstaining. The Fund started in the second half year of 2011 and the fund is managed by Steering Committee of the Community Care Fund.

== Steering Committee ==
The chairperson of the Steering Committee is the administrative secretary. The committee members include twenty members who are from different areas like business, community welfare, education, medical treatment, political, labours and regional and four members from the government. They are responsible for supervising and the overall planning of the fund.

The executive committee under the steering committee is responsible for giving suggestions according to the target needy groups, funding amounts, arrangements of fund-raising and other financial and administrative issues. Four subcommittees (Education, Home affairs, Medical and Welfare) are responsible for the implementation of new projects.

== Assistance programmes ==
=== School-based fund for cross-boundary learning activities ===
It aimed to subsidize students from low-income families to participate in cross-boundary learning activities, which enable them to widen their horizons and gain special learning experiences. The target participants are Primary 1 to Secondary 7 students studying in Hong Kong, they should be full or half granted by the Student Financial Assistance Agency (SFAA).

Covering period: July 2011 to June 2014

=== Community Care Fund medical assistance programme ===
It provides subsidies for patients with financial difficulties to pay medical bills. The targeted recipients are cancer patients. To fit the eligibility criteria, the patient must be eligible within the meaning of the latest relevant government gazette published under the HA Ordinance. Indication and commencement of treatment must be supported by a designated HA doctor as stipulated under the prevailing clinical guidelines. Moreover, an applicant must pass a household-based financial assessment conducted by the Medical Social Workers (MSWs).

Covering period: August 2011 (first phase), January 2012 – August 2012 (second phase)

=== School lunch subsidy ===
Primary students from needy families can get lunch subsidies. The target students are primary one to primary six students who receive full grant under the Student Financial Assistance Scheme and study in whole-day government-aided and Direct Subsidy Scheme (DSS) primary schools (including special schools).

Covering period: 2011–2012 academic year

=== Special care subsidy for the severely disabled ===
The programme aims at providing severely disabled persons who are requiring constant attendance, living in the community and not receiving the Comprehensive Social Security Assistance with a special care subsidy for assisting them to purchase care goods, services or for other purposes related to nursing care.

Covering period: October 2011–present

== Controversy ==
=== One-off measure ===
The fund has been criticized for its ineffectiveness in alleviating poverty as most of the subsidies are one-off payments, such as the One-off Living Subsidy for Low-income Households Not Living in Public Housing and Not Receiving CSSA. People who are out of the safety net asked the measures under the CCF to be regular.

Responding to these voices, the Hong Kong government has regularized some measures since September 2013, including Financial Assistance for Non-school-attending Ethnic Minorities and New Arrivals from the Mainland for Taking Language Examinations, Medical Assistance Programme (second phase) and Subsidy for Non-school-attending Ethnic Minorities and New Arrivals from the Mainland Participating in Language Courses. Also, in the 2014 Policy Address, the government has announced that seven programmes under the fund will be regularized progressively starting from April 2014.

=== School-based fund (cross-boundary learning activities) ===
The initial motive of this subsidy is to provide opportunities for students with financial needs to participate in cross-boundary learning trips. Eligible students can get a $3000 subsidy. However, people commented that subsidies for buying textbooks, stationeries or other learning tools would be more appropriate. Cross-boundary learning trips are not a must in their learning process. People also complained that this programme would benefit travel agencies. After the announcement of the programme, learning trips which cost $2999 were promoted.

=== Lack of support from the business sector ===
The initial proposed funding of the CCF was from both the government and the business sector with each contributing HK$5 billion, but the business sector has shown little support in donations. Carrie Lam, the Chief Secretary for Administration at the time, said the government will no longer actively reach out to businesses for donations, as she “personally” prefers to encourage the private sector to engage in all forms of poverty alleviation activities, instead of just making contributions. As of 31 December 2013, injections from the Government reached $20 billion, whereas the donations pledged and received was only $1.8 billion and $1.468 billion respectively. The imbalance proved its initial attempt to help the poor by receiving assistance from the business sector is unsuccessful.

=== Lack of transparency ===
Usual regular measures for alleviating poverty are to be approved by the Legislative Council of Hong Kong before implementation, but the measures proposed under the CCF are not. Concerns over the transparency of budgets and planning of measures hence were aroused. It was worried that proposals without prior consent of the public could not be carried out smoothly, which would result in a misuse of public funds. In response to this, Carrie Lam, the Chief Secretary for Administration at the time, assured lawmakers that LegCo will always be consulted beforehand if a CCF program costs more than HK$100 million. A biannual report will also allow LegCo to assess the work of the CCF.
