= Sweet Josephine =

- Weight: 16.08 carats (3.216 g)
- Color: Fancy Vivid Pink
- Cut: Cushion-Shaped
- Owner: Joseph Lau
- Estimated value: US $28.5 million

The Sweet Josephine is a 16.08 carats (3.216 g) pink diamond that was sold at a Christie's auction in Geneva in November 2015 for $28.5 million, a record price for a jewel of its kind and one that exceeded its estimated price of $23-28 million.

The diamond, which had been owned by an American family for 15 years prior to its 2015 sale, is the largest cushion-shaped diamond classified by the Gemological Institute of America as "fancy vivid" ever to be sold at auction, regardless of color, and it is one of only three "fancy" pink diamonds weighing more than 10 carats to be sold in the previous 250 years.

The diamond was sold to Hong Kong billionaire Joseph Lau, a convicted felon and fugitive, who named it the "Sweet Josephine" diamond for his seven-year-old daughter, Josephine. On the day following its sale, Lau spent a record $48.4 million to purchase a blue diamond auctioned by Sotheby's that he then named, again for his daughter, the Blue Moon of Josephine Diamond.

== See also ==
- List of diamonds
