= Thomas Lau =

Hong Kong businessman

Chairman of the Chinese Estates Holdings
- In office DD-MM-YYYY – DD-MM-YYYY
- Succeeded by: Joseph Lau
- In office DD-MM-YYYY – DD-MM-YYYY
- Succeeded by: Joseph Lau

Personal details
- Born: Lau Luen-hung; 1953 (age 72–73) Hong Kong
- Relations: Joseph Lau (brother)
- Children: 2
- Education: University of Toronto (BA); University of Windsor (MBA)
- Occupation: Businessman
- Nickname: Small Lau/Younger Lau (細劉)

Thomas Lau Luen-hung (born 1953) is a Hong Kong business magnate of Teochew descent. He is the chairman and CEO of Lifestyle International Holdings which operates one of Hong Kong's largest department stores, Sogo Hong Kong. He is a member of the Twelfth Chinese People's Political Consultative Conference Shanghai Committee and sits on the board of directors for Shanghai Jiao Tong University.

== Personal life ==
He is the younger brother of billionaire Joseph Lau, the 4th richest man in Hong Kong; and is nicknamed "Younger Lau" (細劉) to distinguish from Joseph, nicknamed "Elder Lau" (大劉), whose name is pronounced the same in Cantonese.

His children, Lau Kam Sen and Lau Kam Shim, are executive directors of Lifestyle International Holdings.
