= Joseph Lau =

Hong Kong businessman (born 1951)

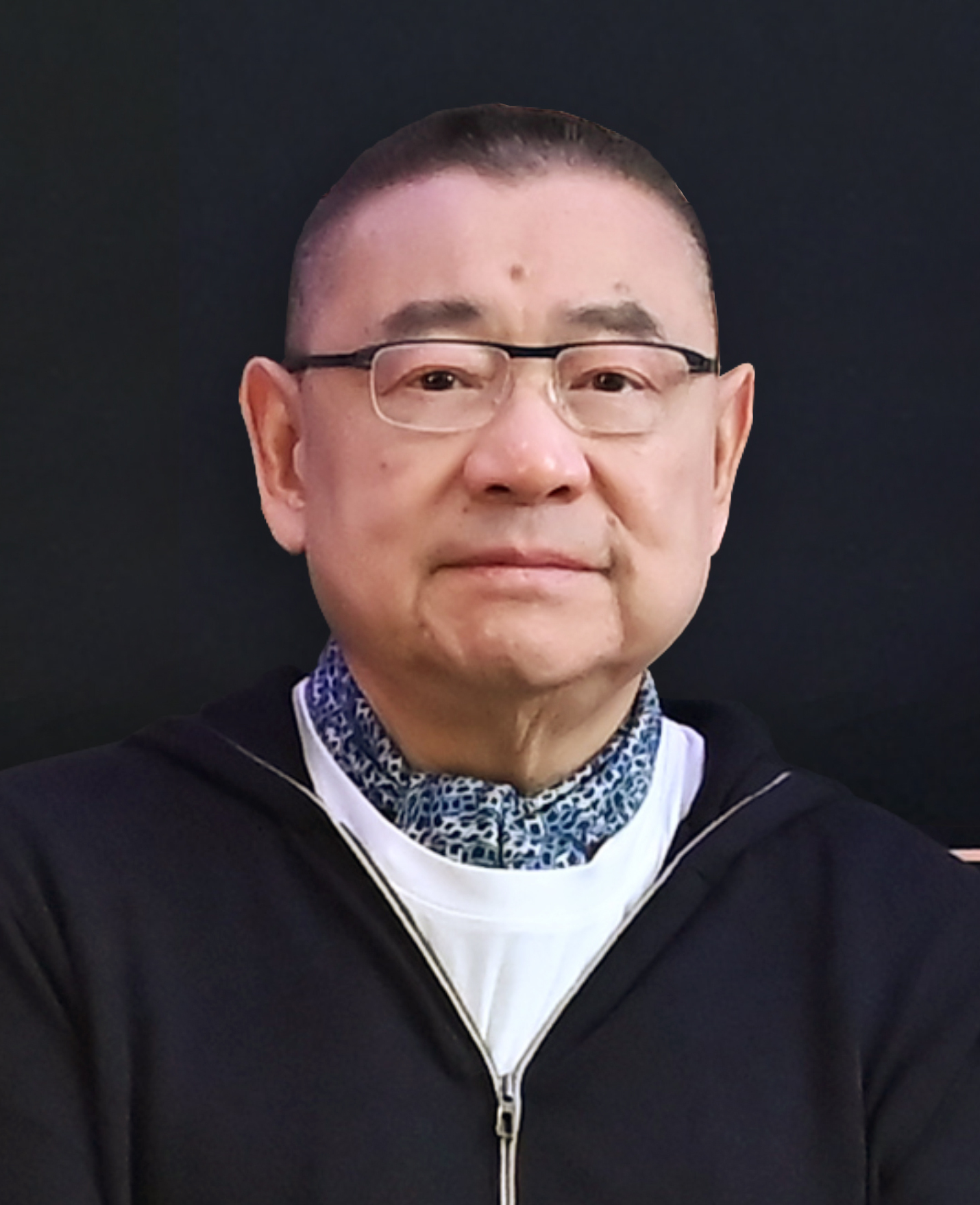
- Lau in 2021

Chairman of Chinese Estates Holdings
- In office 12 December 2006 – 14 March 2014
- Deputy: Lau Ming Wai
- Preceded by: Thomas Lau
- Succeeded by: Lau Ming Wai
- In office 1992 – 18 November 1999
- Preceded by: Thomas Lau
- Succeeded by: Thomas Lau

CEO of the Chinese Estates Holdings
- In office 11 April 2006 – 14 March 2014
- Succeeded by: Lau Ming Wai

Chairman of the Kwong Sang Hong International Limited
- In office 24 February 1998 – 18 November 1999
- Preceded by: Philip Leigh Tose
- Succeeded by: Thomas Lau

Chairman of Evergo China Holdings Limited
- In office 1994 – 18 November 1999
- Succeeded by: Thomas Lau

Personal details
- Born: Lau Luen-hung; 19 July 1951 (age 75) British Hong Kong
- Citizenship: United Kingdom; Hong Kong
- Spouse(s): Theresa Po Wing-kam† (1977–1992, 2 children); Kimbee Chan (2016–present, 3 children)
- Relations: Thomas Lau (brother)
- Children: 7
- Education: University of Windsor, Canada
- Occupation: Businessman
- Nickname: Big Lau/Elder Lau (大劉)

Joseph Lau Luen Hung
- Traditional Chinese: 劉鑾雄
- Simplified Chinese: 刘銮雄
Transcriptions
Standard Mandarin
- Hanyu Pinyin: Liú Luánxióng
Yue: Cantonese
- Jyutping: lau4 lyun4 hung4

Joseph Lau Luen-hung (Chinese: 劉鑾雄; born 21 July 1951) is a Hong Kong billionaire businessman. Lau is the former chairman of property developer Chinese Estates. He is an avid art and wine collector. His fortune is estimated by Forbes at $13.3 billion as of September 2021. In 2014, he became a convicted felon and fugitive in Macau.

He lives in one of the most expensive houses in Hong Kong, at Goldsmith Road, Jardine's Lookout, valued at HK$2.5 billion with Chan Hoi-wan.

== Life and career ==
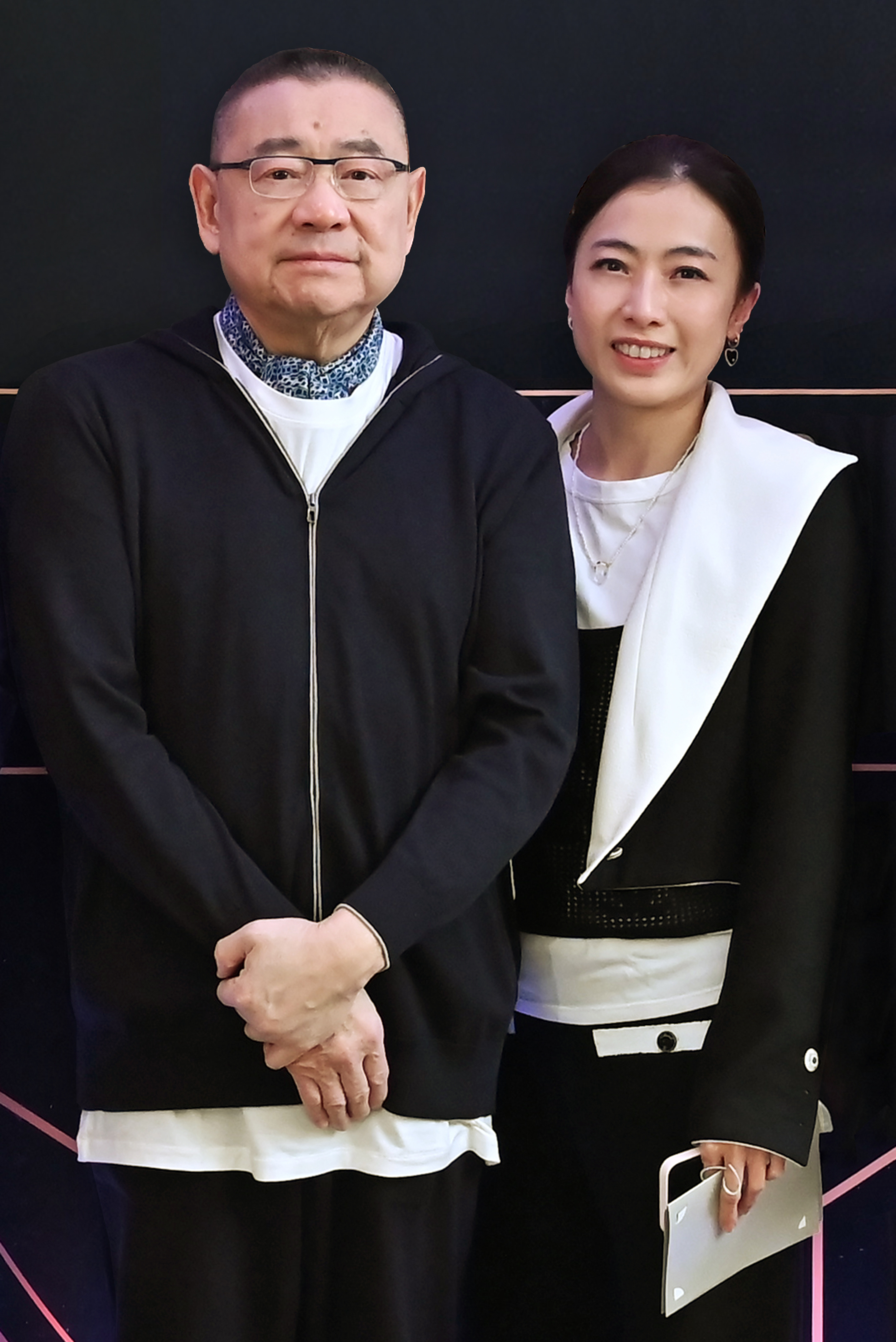
Joseph Lau (left) and his wife Kimbee Chan in 2021

Joseph Lau was born on 19 July 1951 in Hong Kong. He has a younger brother, Thomas, and two younger sisters, and is nicknamed "Elder Lau" (大劉), to distinguish from Thomas, nicknamed "Younger Lau" (細劉), whose name is pronounced the same in Cantonese. Lau attended the University of Windsor in Canada before returning to join his family's business making electric fans in 1974. In 1978, he established the company Evergo Industrial Enterprise, while Thomas, his brother, inherited the family business. In 1983, the company held an initial public offering in Hong Kong. In 1985, Lau switched Evergo's business focus to investment-holding and property-management services.

Lau became the majority shareholder of Chinese Estates Holdings when he acquired a 43% stake in the company through Evergo in 1986. Since then, he's expanded his real estate investments through a series of acquisitions.

In 1988, under the leadership of Lau, the Group diversified its property interests to Mainland China through the participation in the development of Oriental Arts Building Complex and Hilton Hotel in Beijing. In 1998, The Group, through a 50:50 joint venture vehicle, acquired around 64.29% interest in a listed company, The Kwong Sang Hong International Limited ("Kwong Sang Hong") in January.

Chinese Estates Holdings developed The ONE, the tallest retail complex in Hong Kong, which opened in 2010. In 2017, Lau gifted the property to his wife Kimbee Chan Hoi-wan and their children.

In March 2014, Lau resigned from his positions as chairman and CEO of Chinese Estates after a Macau court convicted him of bribery and money laundering. His son Lau Ming-wai acceded to the chairmanship of the company. Sue Chan, the elder sister of Lau's wife Kimbee, became the chief executive of the company Lau founded.

== Charity ==
Since the early 1990s, Lau and his Charitable Trust have donated nearly HK$5 billion to various institutions, including numerous individual cases. Major beneficiaries included Education and Healthcare, each account for approximately 20% of the total, while cases for the Under-privileged make up about 10%. The remainder includes categories such as Environmental Protection and Cultural Services.

Lau has been a film enthusiast since childhood. In an effort to support the Hong Kong film industry, The Joseph Lau Luen Hung Charitable Trust donated HK$10 million to the "Fresh Wave Film Festival" in 2018, encouraging local young creators with potential who aspire to work in film. During the pandemic, to alleviate the hardships faced by grassroots film workers, the Trust contributed HK$10 million to a Support Programme initiated by the Hong Kong Performing Artistes Guild in 2020.

In early 2021, the Trust supported One Cool Group with HK$15 million to cooperate on 5 local film production. In the same year, the Trust donated HK$10 million to the Federation of Hong Kong Filmmakers's "Keep Rolling Keep Running" Programme, aiming to support the industry in overcoming challenges during the pandemic.

Since the 2021 academic year, in order to commend underprivileged students who successfully enroll in the 8 major universities in Hong Kong, The Joseph Lau Luen Hung Charitable Trust has launched a scholarship programme. The programme has a budget of approximately HK$1 million for its first academic year and awards outstanding students from the 8 universities, including the HKU, CUHK, HKUST, PolyU, CityU, HKBU, LU, and EdUHK. Through this encouragement, the programme aims to support academically excellent students in receiving a quality education, helping them move toward their aspirations and contribute to society.

In 2023, Kimbee Chan, the Director of Trustee of The Joseph Lau Luen Hung Charitable Trust, along with her eldest daughter, Josephine, spent about a week visiting impoverished areas in Liangshan, Sichuan (四川涼山), delivered care and cheers to children by showing support to local girls' education development.

In 2025, a medical complex of The First Affiliated Hospital, Sun Yat-sen University was inaugurated. The total investment in the complex exceeds HK$600 million, with a donation of HK$400 million from The Joseph Lau Luen Hung Charitable Trust. The complex was therefore named after Lau (劉鑾雄樓). The complex's opening further enhances the Hospital's capabilities in diagnosing and treating critical illnesses, as well as its emergency medical response and rescue abilities, bringing more resources for quality healthcare services. In addition to establishing a Women's and Children's Centre and the International Medical Centre, the Hospital has collaborated with the Mass General Brigham (MGB) of Harvard University and the Foshan Hospital of Traditional Chinese Medicine to create a Sports Medicine Centre that combines Western and Traditional Chinese medicine. The Hospital's Intensive Care Unit (ICU) is equipped with VitalGo electric beds valued at HK$600,000, which help improve patient mobility and comfort. Furthermore, the complex also includes an emergency centre, a surgical centre, and a rooftop helipad for emergency rescue helicopters, establishing a 30-minute medical emergency response network for the Guangdong-Hong Kong-Macao Greater Bay Area.

Meanwhile, Lau Ming-Wai also made significant contributions to charity and social progress. In 2016, Lau Ming-Wai donated US$50 million (approx. HK$390 million) to the Karolinska Institutet in Sweden, enabling the establishment of the "Ming Wai Lau Centre for Reparative Medicine" in Hong Kong, which is the Institutet's first hub outside of Sweden.

== Art and wine collections ==
Lau is an avid art collector. He ranks among ARTnews's list of the "Top 200 Collectors." In 2017, Forbes has estimated the total value of his art collection at around a $1 billion.

Lau owns the painting Everything Must Go (1984) by Jean-Michel Basquiat. In 2006, Lau purchased Andy Warhol's Mao (1977), a portrait of Mao Zedong, for $17.4 million at Christie's. In 2007, Lau purchased Paul Gauguin's Te Poipoi (The Morning) (1892), a painting of a Tahitian scene, for $39.2 million at a Sotheby's auction.

In February 2020, Lau offered his David Hockney painting The Splash (1966) at Sotheby's contemporary art sale in London. The painting sold for $29.9 million, which is the third highest price ever achieved for a Hockney at auction.

Lau owns a collection of more than 10,000 bottles of red wine. In October 2020, the sales of Lau's French wines at Sotheby's in Hong Kong brought a total of $6.8 million, more than doubling pre-sale expectations. Following the success of the sale, Lau sold 147 lots (533 bottles in total) again at Sotheby's in Hong Kong. The sale brought a total of $6.8 million, also doubling its pre-sale estimate.

In May 2025, Lau's "Iconic Wines Part III" live auction at Christie's has exceeded all expectations, with the hammer falling at HK$72.9 million, more than double the auction house's low estimate. The top lot, a prized set of 10 bottles of Henri Jayer's Vosne-Romanée Cros Parantoux 1999, achieved HK$3.25 million, more than triple its low estimate. The distinguished collection also featured coveted treasures from Domaine de la Romanée-Conti, Lafite, Leflaive, and Petrus.

== Personal life ==
Lau married Po Wing-kam (1954–2003) in 1977 and they were divorced in 1992. They had two children: a son, Lau Ming-wai (born 1979 Dec) and daughter Jade Lau Sau-yung (born 1983). In 2008, Lau Ming-wai's wife gave birth to twins; they are Lau's eldest grandchildren. Lau Ming-wai, a British citizen, is vice-chairman of Chinese Estates Group and is both chairman of the government's Commission on Youth and on the steering committee of the HK$10 billion Community Care Fund, established in 2010. He was formerly a member of the Commission on Poverty. In 2011, he was part of Henry Tang's election team for the 2012 chief executive election.

Lau had four additional children with two women concurrently out of wedlock, two with Yvonne Lui and two with Kimbee Chan (aka Chan Hoi-wan). His third child with Kimbee Chan came after their marriage.

In May 2007, Lau was revealed to be among the first seven purchasers of a Boeing 787 Dreamliner jet for private use.

In 2009, Lau bought a 7.03 carat blue diamond for his daughter Josephine, that he named the "Star of Josephine" at Sotheby's for $9.5 million.

In November 2015, Lau bought two expensive diamonds for his 7-year-old daughter Josephine. On 10 November, he bought a 16.08 carat pink diamond at Christie's for $28.5 million. The next day, Lau bought a 12.03 carat blue diamond at Sotheby's for $48.4 million, setting new records for the most expensive jewel sold at auction and the most expensive diamond ever. He subsequently renamed them the "Sweet Josephine" and the "Blue Moon of Josephine" respectively after his daughter.

On 7 December 2016, Lau married Kimbee Chan in Hong Kong. In 2017, citing serious health issues, the business tycoon has transferred his 75% shares in Chinese Estates to his new wife and his son.

== Legal issues ==
On 31 May 2012, the Macau Court of Final Appeal confirmed that Lau and Steven Lo were involved in the case of offering Macau's former public works chief Ao Man-long HK$20 million over the bid for five plots of land opposite Macau International Airport. Lau and Lo were charged with bribery and money laundering. They both denied the charges and Lo earlier told the court that the HK$20 million was a preliminary payment to construction company San Meng Fai.

On 14 March 2014 Lau and Lo were found guilty of the charges against them in Macau's Court of First Instance. Lau was sentenced to five years and three months in prison, but he appealed. However, on 19 July 2015, the Court of Second Instance rejected his and Lo's appeals and let the length of their prison terms stand. Lau has so far evaded extradition and remains as a fugitive at large, as Macau and Hong Kong do not have an extradition treaty.
