= The Church of God in Hong Kong =

Christian church in Hong Kong

The Church of God in Hong Kong 香港神的教會
- 香港神的教會
- Formation: 1968
- Founders: Daniel Kwong Chiu Yu
- Type: Christian Church
- Headquarters: Hong Kong Kwai Chung Shop 7, Upper G/F, Lai Chi Kok Bay Garden, 272 Lai King Hill Rd, Kwai Chung
- Location: Hong KongShatin
- Region served: Hong Kong
- Affiliations: Light and Love Home; Life’s Spring Publisher Ltd. Sing through the Land Music Centre; Vital Comfort (Hong Kong) Ltd.
- Website: http://www.churchofgod.org.hk

The Church of God in Hong Kong (Chinese: 香港神的教會), commenced in 1968, is a biblical Christian church in Hong Kong. Its main office is located at Shop 7, Upper G/F, Lai Chi Kok Bay Garden, 272 Lai King Hill Road, Kwai Chung, N.T. There are 16 meeting places located in Hong Kong Island, Kowloon and the New Territories. The church has a congregation of about 5,000 members.

== Overview ==
The Church of God in Hong Kong was founded by Yu Kwong Chiu Daniel in 1968, and started its ministry in Shatin. In the 1970s, the members started to attend meetings at Pui Shing Primary School in Lam Tin. Mr Yu, together with other Christians, preached the gospel to the children in public estates. In the late 1970s, their ministry expanded to Tsuen Wan that attracted factory workers and secondary school students. Today, the church has spread its ministry in various categories of people including children, primary schools students, secondary schools students, university students, on-job population, families, seniors and the elderly.

In 1982, the Church began their overseas ministry, and first established "The Church of God in Macau". For more than 30 years, the church has established meeting places in 59 cities. This Church is different from other denominational churches in terms of its practice of “global unity”, that all local churches are not independent, and that they support and maintain stable and close connections with one another.

In 1983, the Church established the "Light and Love Home" as a non-profit organization to serve the community, especially the needy, and to preach the Gospel. The Home has already developed its services to other countries to serve the locals. The Home promotes its international services to different countries including Madagascar, to especially care for the orphans, set up orphanages and schools, and to provide educational sponsorships and scholarships.

== Organization ==
The Church of God in Hong Kong obeys the teachings of the bible that the church is being ministered by a group of elders who are more mature among the brothers and sisters. Some elders steadfastly pray and preach as full-time co-workers, some are on-the-job while all of them devote themselves and shepherd the young ones. The Church also sets to serve the household.

== Meeting places in Hong Kong ==
=== Hong Kong Island ===
- The Church of God in Hong Kong (Shau Kei Wan)
- The Church of God in Hong Kong (Sheung Wan)

=== Kowloon ===
- The Church of God in Hong Kong (Kwun Tong Montery Plaza)
- The Church of God in Hong Kong (Ngau Tau Kok Ting On Street)

=== New Territories ===
- The Church of God in Hong Kong Main Office ( Lai Chi Kok Bay Garden)
- The Church of God in Hong Kong (Yuet Bor Building, Kwai Fong )
- The Church of God in Hong Kong ( Victory Court, Kwai Fong)
- The Church of God in Hong Kong (Yuet Loong Building, Kwai Fong)
- The Church of God in Hong Kong (Chik Shun Street, Tai Wai)
- The Church of God in Hong Kong (Lai Sing Mansion, Tai Wai)
- The Church of God in Hong Kong (Kwong Fuk Road, Tai Po)
- The Church of God in Hong Kong (Fu Hing Street, Sheung Shui)
- The Church of God in Hong Kong (Tuen Mun Central Square)
- The Church of God in Hong Kong (Wing Fu Mansion, Yuen Long)
- The Church of God in Hong Kong (Ping Shan, Yuen Long)
- The Church of God in Hong Kong (Ping Wu Garden, Tin Shui Wai)

== Worldwide Meeting Places ==
In 1982, the Church first established "The Church of God in Macau". Now, the church has 59 meeting places globally, all practicing “Global Unity”. The Church of God in Hong Kong continuously holds international united meetings and activities, as well as gathering brothers and sisters to form missionary teams to preach in different parts of the world and support local churches.

== Church management and fiscal management ==
All the expenses of the Church of God in Hong Kong are the offerings/ dedication from the believers. The church regularly updates the financial report and holds annual assemblies to make their financial situation open to public.

The Church of God in Hong Kong sets up a financial committee to inspect the revenue and expenditure of the church, which is finally examined by the elders. The church entrusts auditors to carry out financial audit and publicizes the audit report every year.

== Affiliate organisations ==
Affiliate organisations of the Church of God in Hong Kong includes:

=== Light and Love Home ===
Light and Love Home Hong Kong was founded in 1983, with motto as “to serve the community and preach the Gospel”. The organization established its first non-profit making private elderly home to serve the local seniors in need. Today, Light and Love Elderly Hostel has already developed into a large-scale elderly home which is funded by the Community Chest of Hong Kong. Light and Love Home has also diversified its services in recent years.

=== Life’s Spring Publisher Ltd. ===
Life’s Spring Publisher Ltd. was established in 1987. It has been governed by a group of zealous Christians of the Church of God In Hong Kong, with a purpose to help build a church according to the principles of the Holy Bible. Through its print and multimedia publications, Life's Spring Publisher Ltd. hopes to preach the gospel, spread out the biblical truths, build up saints, and establish a church that is after God's heart.

=== Sing Through the Land Music Centre ===
Sing Through the Land Music Centre was founded by a group of Christians from the Church of God in Hong Kong since 2015. It hopes to spread the will of God and share His love throughout the world by hymns and music. It has been nurturing music talents and providing various performance opportunities since its establishment. The centre is committed to provide music education to all walks of life irrespective of their diversified musical background and abilities.

== Recent events ==
=== Miracle of Music ===
On the 1st January 2017, the Church of God in Hong Kong, together with Sing Through the Land Music Centre and Light and Love Home, organized an event called “Miracle of Music”, which successfully broke the Guinness World Records Largest Ukulele Ensemble with 6,125 participants. Through this event, the organizers hope to promote and raise public awareness on the importance of healthy family, harmonious community and happy person through learning, performing and breaking record together.

=== Goal to Fly Music Volunteering Program ===
The Church of God in Hong Kong organized Goal to Fly Music Volunteering Program in Summer 2016. Through the influence of music, Goal to Fly hopes to bless the world and let people know God's love and His will. During the summer of 2016, "Goal to Fly" held a series of concerts. Through performance like music, drama and dance, the concerts presented the challenges and aspirations of young people to explore the true meaning of life and value.

=== Love & Joy Hong Kong ===
The Church of God in Hong Kong organized regional gospel activities in Hong Kong, including carnivals at Fly the Flyover Operation and an Ocean Park fun day with over 6,000 participants.

== Defamation controversies ==
In 1981, a cult organization “Children of God” was active in Hong Kong, and attracted a lot of local news coverage. However, news reporters linked The Church of God in Hong Kong with cult activities and made false reports.

In July 1985, the Church of God in Hong Kong filed with the High Court for defamatory reports of Luen Yik Publishing.

In 1986, another publisher made a false report towards the Church of God in Hong Kong. The editor of the publisher (Overseas Chinese Daily News) made an apology and clarified after knowing the truth.

=== Victory in the case of defamation ===
The case of the Church of God in Hong Kong underwent one week of trial in May 1987. In conclusion of the case, the Hong Kong judge ruled in favor of the Church, receiving a compensation of HKD260,000. In the judgement, the judge praised the elders representing the church in the court.
