= Sceneway Garden =

Housing estate in Lam Tin, Kowloon

- Traditional Chinese: 匯景花園
- Simplified Chinese: 汇景花园
Transcriptions
Standard Mandarin
- Hanyu Pinyin: Huì Jǐng Huāyuán
Yue: Cantonese
- Jyutping: wui6 ging2 faa1 jyun4*2

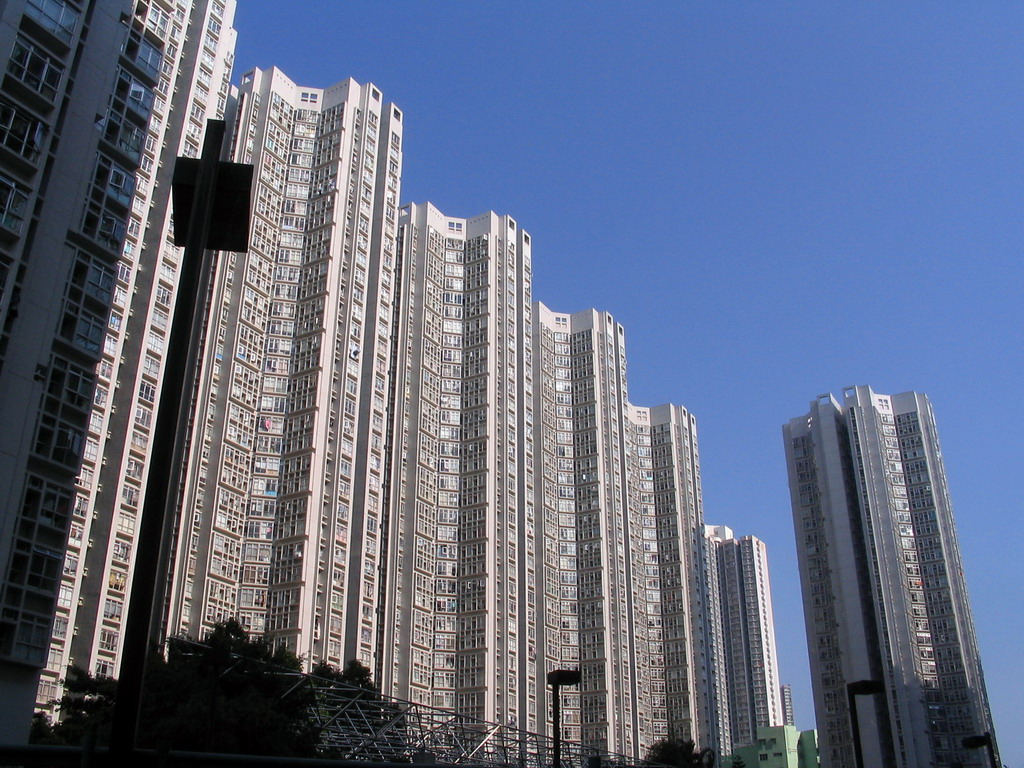
Outline of Sceneway Garden in November 2007

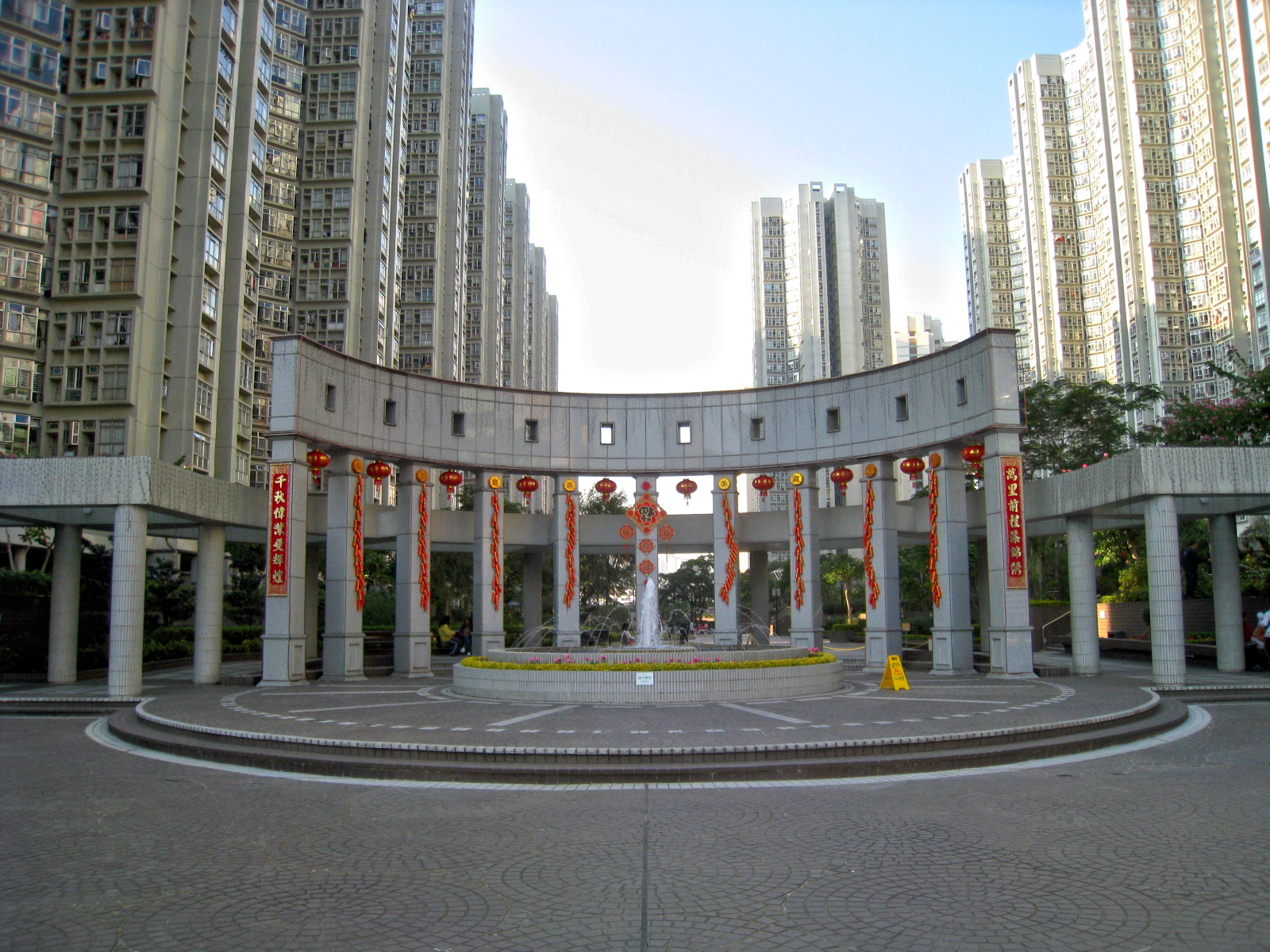
Entrance to Sceneway Garden in January 2009

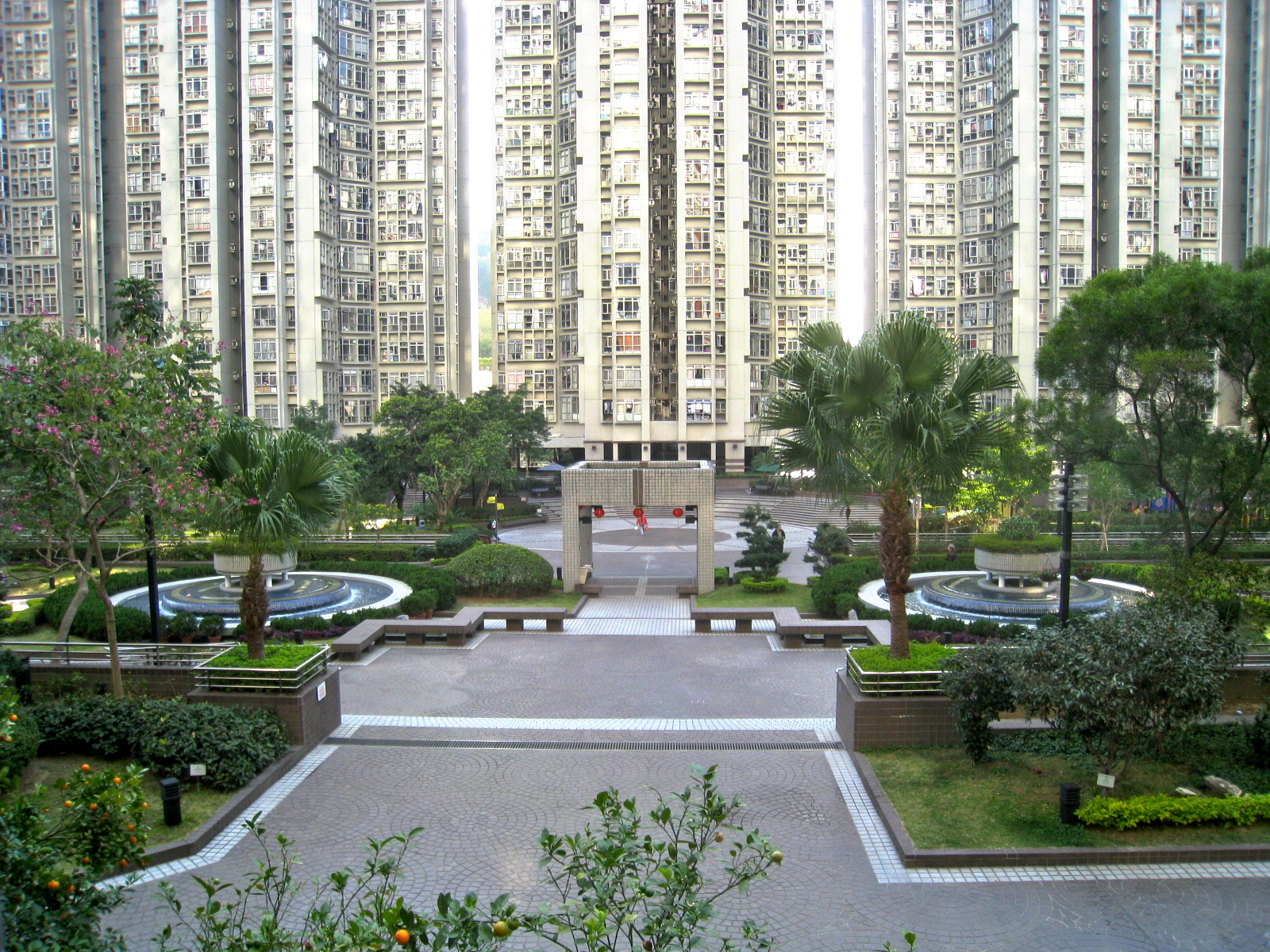
Sceneway Garden Openspace in January 2009

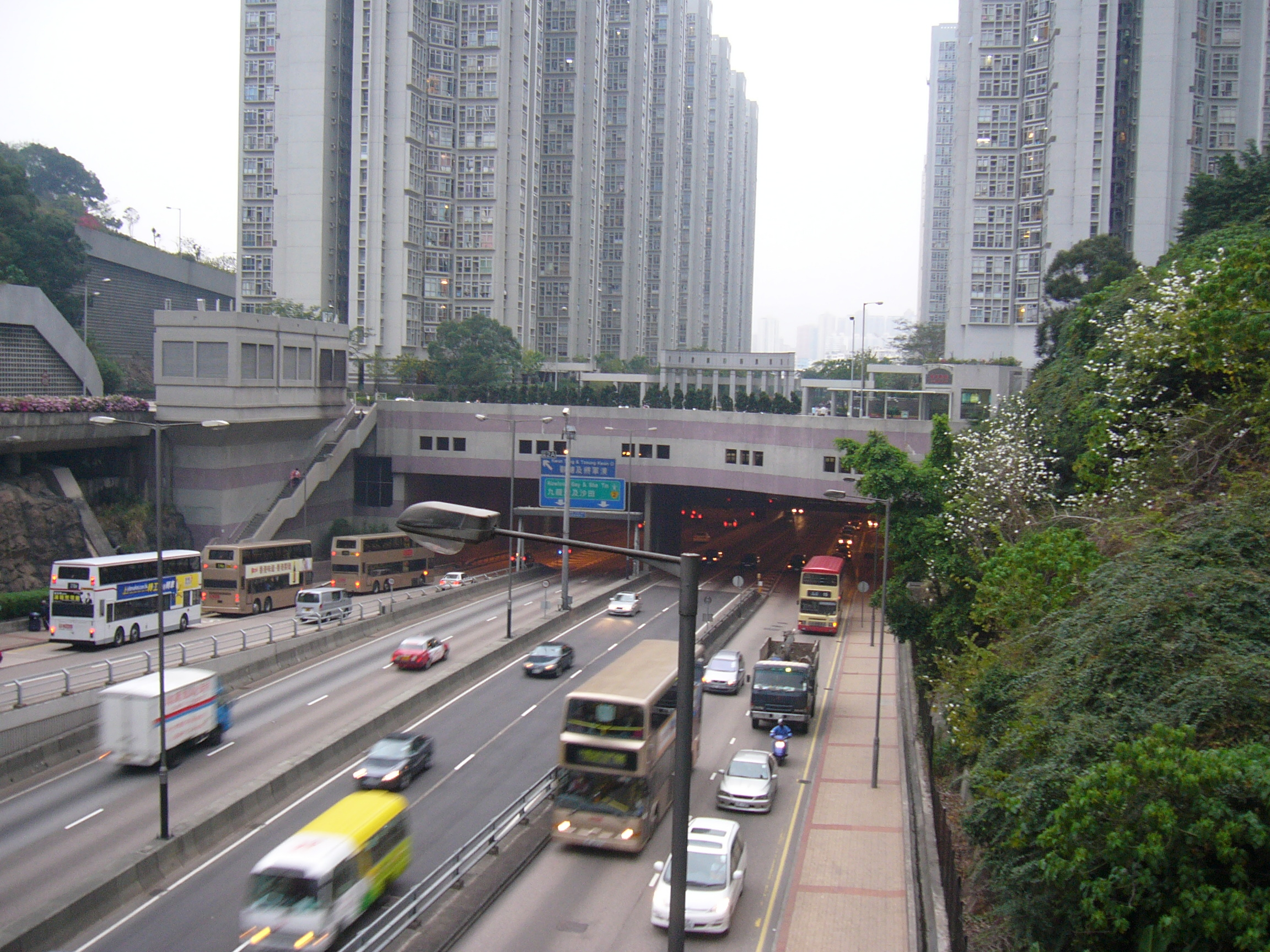
Lei Yue Mun Road passing beneath Sceneway Garden in March 2006

Sceneway Garden (Chinese: 匯景花園) is a private housing estate in Lam Tin, Hong Kong, built by Cheung Kong Holdings, and completed in 1992. Sceneway Garden is one of the few dog-friendly and pet-friendly private housing estates in Hong Kong, with a large open space for recreation that is suitable for exercising dogs.

== Structure and location ==
Sceneway Garden is built on top of the Lam Tin MTR station and Lam Tin Bus Terminus, providing transport to residents. Located near the Eastern Harbour Crossing, Sceneway Garden also has an outlet to Hong Kong Island.

Situated on a platform above Route 2, the underlying layer of the platform houses a shopping mall, Sceneway Plaza, and a link to the MTR station. Two other major shopping plazas in Hong Kong, APM and Laguna Plaza are close by.

Sceneway Garden consists of 17 blocks, blocks 9 to 17 in Phase B, which was unveiled earlier and are 28 floors tall each, and blocks 1 to 8 in Phase A, with heights varying from 31 floors to 34 floors.

== History ==
In the late 1980s, Cheung Kong acquired two pieces of land in Lam Tin, one being a former Shell oil depot, the other above the newly built Lam Tin MTR station and bus terminus, and developed them into Laguna City and Sceneway Garden respectively. Laguna City was completed in 1991 and Sceneway Garden was completed in 1992.

== Demographics ==
Census data indicate that Sceneway Garden had a population of 12,490 in 2011, mostly Hong Kong Chinese. However, due to the presence of a Japanese school nearby in Laguna City, Japanese people also form a large proportion of the residents, in comparison to other residential developments in Hong Kong.

== Education ==
Sceneway Garden is in Primary One Admission (POA) School Net 48. Within the school net are multiple aided schools (operated independently but funded with government money) and Kwun Tong Government Primary School.

== See also ==
- Sai Tso Wan, Kowloon
