= Sceneway Plaza =

Shopping centre in Lam Tin, Hong Kong

Coordinates: 22.3064°N 114.2341°E

- Traditional Chinese: 滙景廣場（香港）
- Simplified Chinese: 汇景广场（香港）
Transcriptions
Standard Mandarin
- Hanyu Pinyin: Huì Jǐng Guǎngchǎng
Yue: Cantonese
- Jyutping: wui6 ging2 gwong2 coeng4 hong3 kong6

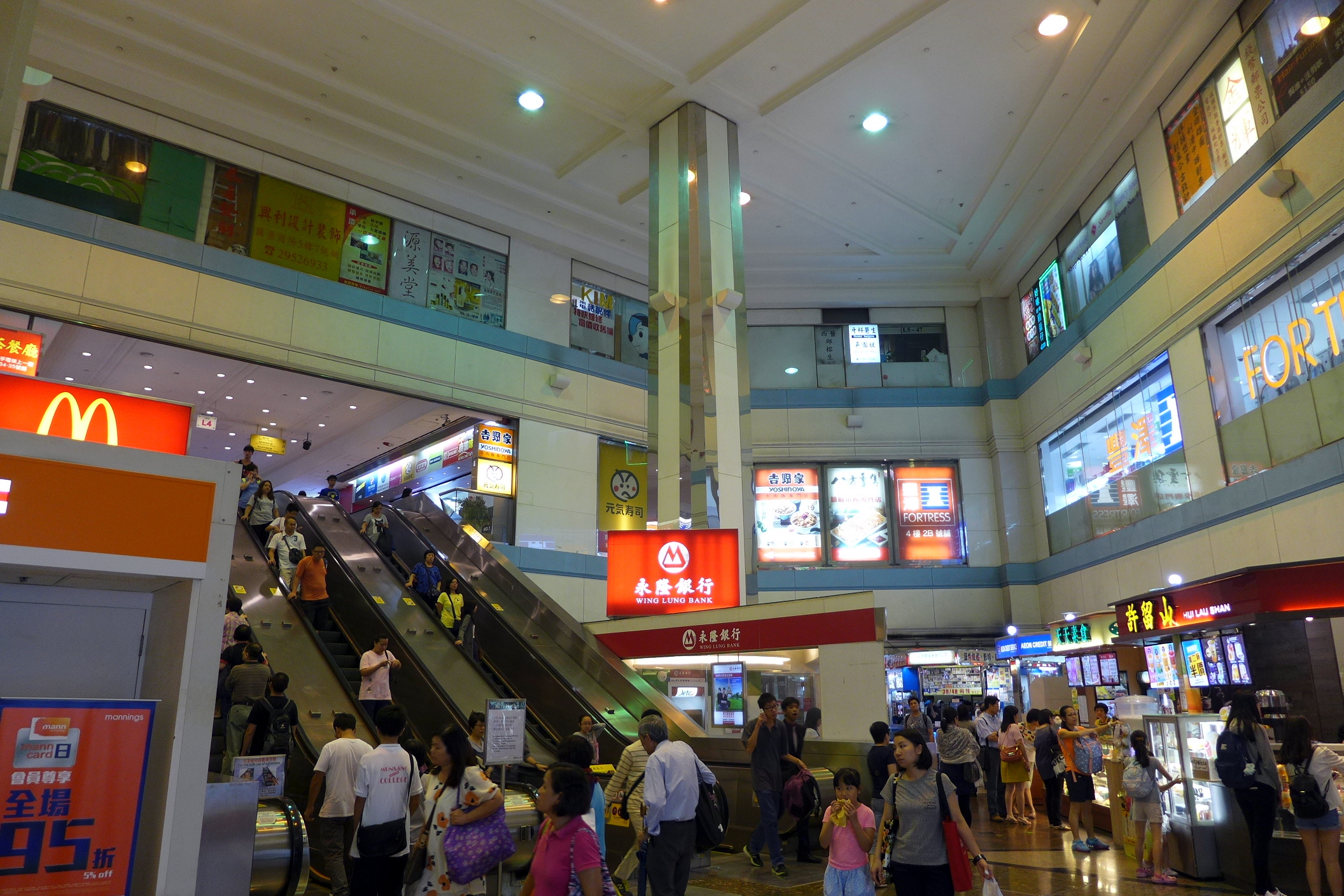
3/F, showing the escalator area

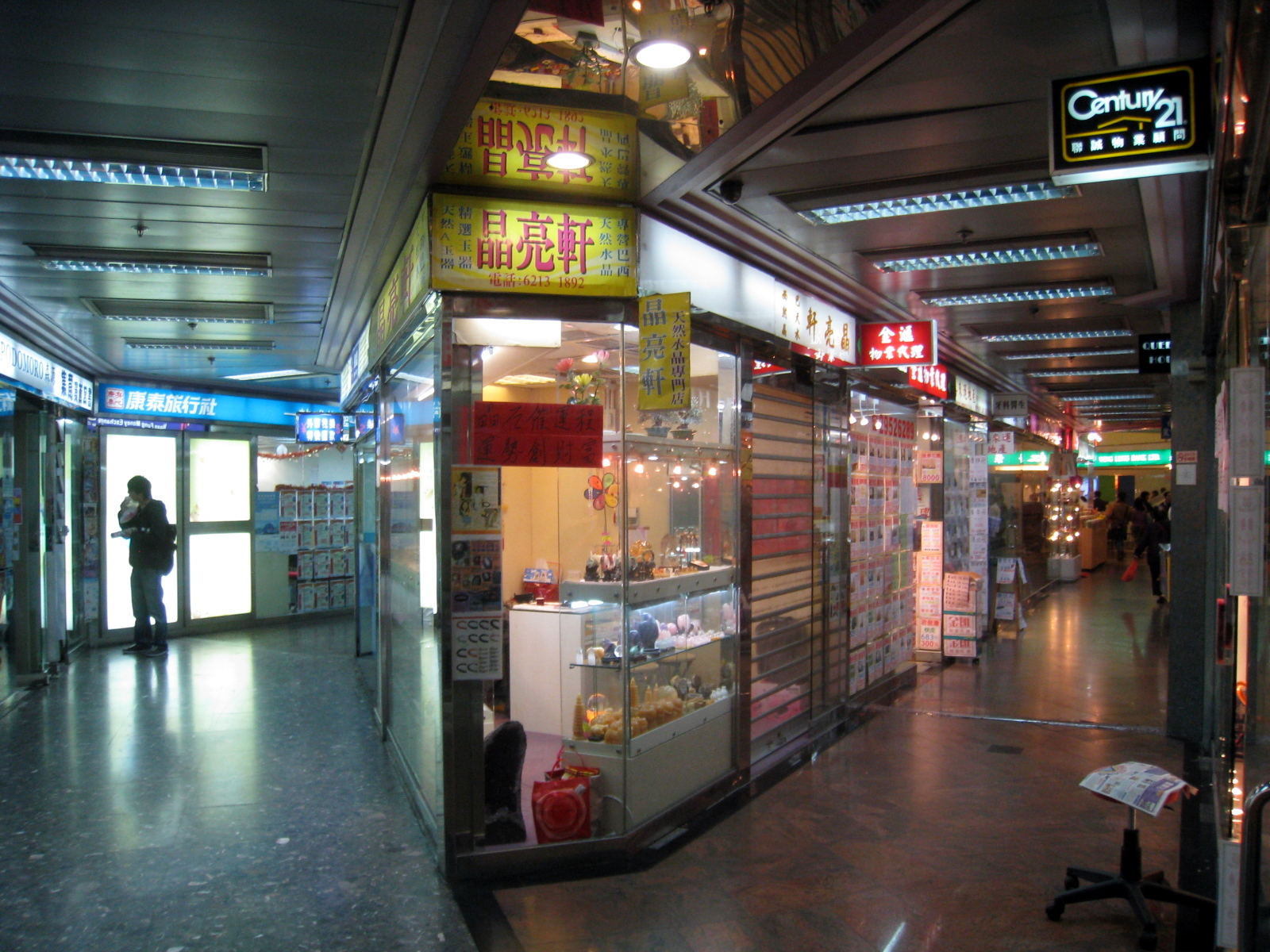
Sceneway Plaza G/F Entrance

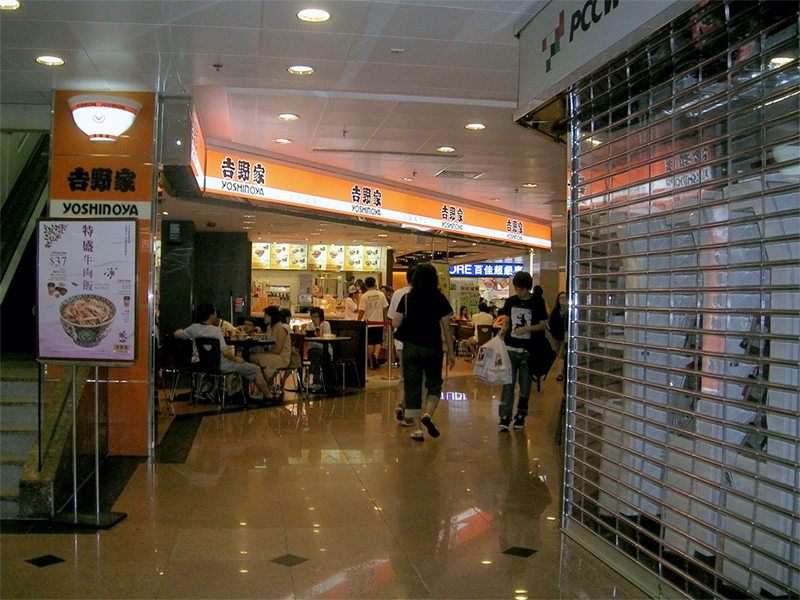
The PARKnSHOP area in 4/F

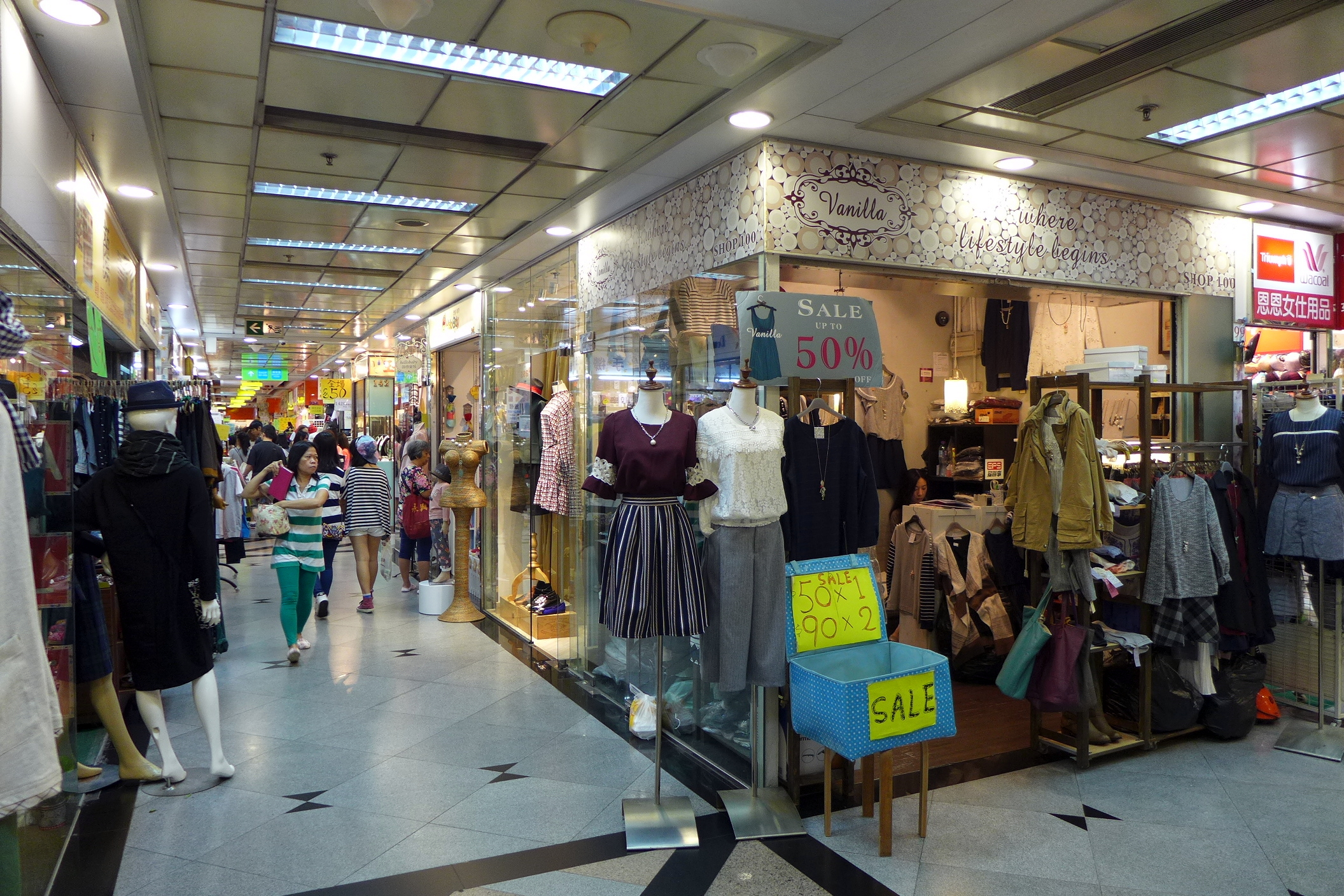
Shops on level 5 of Sceneway Plaza

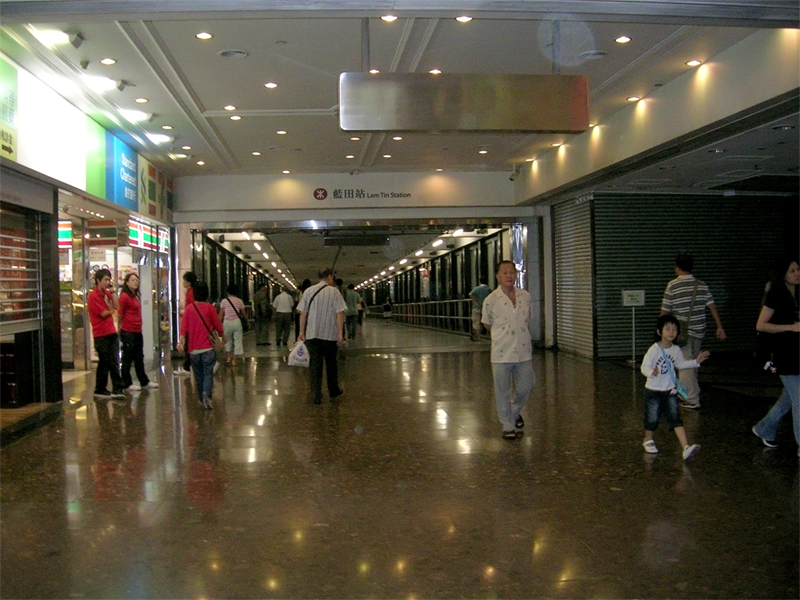
Lam Tin station, MTR

Hong Kong Sceneway Plaza (Chinese: 滙景廣場; Jyutping: wui6 ging2 gwong2 coeng4) is a shopping centre in Lam Tin, Kowloon, Hong Kong. It also contains the East Kowloon Office of the Immigration Department. Opened in February 1992, the shopping centre is located adjacent to Lam Tin station of Hong Kong's Mass Transit Railway (MTR). The plaza, which used to be a Japanese department store called Yaohan, contains many small stores including fashion, stationery, and music shops.

The complex has five floors, but only three are used for multiple retail outlets. One floor contains the offices of the Immigration Department and the bottom floor has only a bookstore (in addition to the escalator).

== Dining ==
Several Chinese tea restaurants are located near the public apartments in Lam Tin, and private estates are situated near Sceneway Plaza, resulting in a large number of dining establishments that range from cantonese restaurants to McDonald's. In addition, several unlicensed shops that serve cold noodles have opened. They had been monitored by the Food and Environmental Hygiene Department, but their low prices attracted a large number of students who tended to litter Sceneway Plaza with packaging materials, causing environmental problems. Yoshinoya opened in July 2006.

In July 2006, the Shanghainese restaurant was closed permanently. In August 2006, a Fairwood fast-food restaurant opened in its place.

In June 2010, Mr Cake, a cake and dessert specialist, opened on the fifth floor. They serve Hokkaido chiffon cakes, serradura, mango puddings, Taiwanese egg cakes and other desserts. Many of its products are unique to Sceneway Plaza and its surrounding area.

== Public transport ==
Sceneway Plaza's main public transport is MTR and buses that pass the Eastern Harbour Crossing to most places in Kowloon and Hong Kong Island.

== See also ==
- Sceneway Garden
