= Lam Tin station =

MTR station in Kowloon, Hong Kong

Lam Tin 藍田
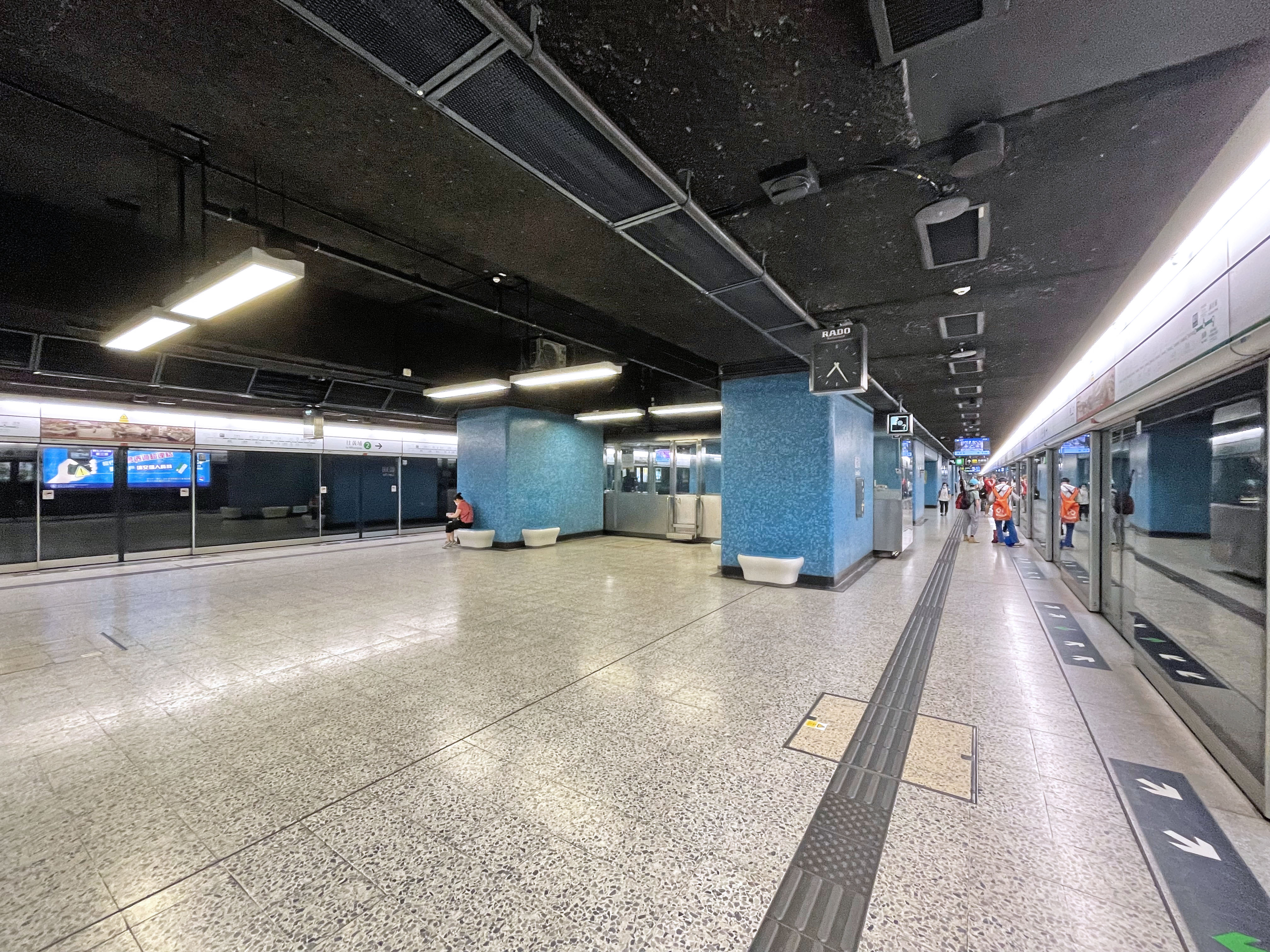
- Platform of Lam Tin station

Chinese name
- Traditional Chinese: 藍田
- Simplified Chinese: 蓝田
- Jyutping: Laam4tin4
- Hanyu Pinyin: Lántián
- Literal meaning: Blue Field
Transcriptions
Standard Mandarin
- Hanyu Pinyin: Lántián
Yue: Cantonese
- Yale Romanization: Làamtìn
- IPA: [lam˩tʰin˩]
- Jyutping: Laam4tin4

General information
- Location: Lei Yue Mun Road, Sai Tso Wan; Kwun Tong District, Hong Kong
- Coordinates: 22°18′24″N 114°13′59″E
- System: MTR rapid transit station
- Operator: MTR Corporation
- Line: Kwun Tong line
- Platforms: 2 (1 island platform)
- Tracks: 2
- Connections: Bus, minibus

Construction
- Structure type: At-grade
- Platform levels: 1
- Accessible: yes

Other information
- Station code: LAT

History
- Opened: 9 August 1989; 37 years ago

Services
Preceding station	MTR	Following station
Kwun Tong towards Whampoa	Kwun Tong line	Yau Tong towards Tiu Keng Leng

Former services
Preceding station	MTR	Following station
Kwun Tong towards Yau Ma Tei	Kwun Tong line (1989-2002)	Quarry Bay towards North Point
Track layout
Location
- Location within MTR

Lam Tin (Chinese: 藍田; Cantonese Yale: Làamtìn) is a station on the Hong Kong MTR Kwun Tong line built as a part of the extension to Quarry Bay. The station is linked to the nearby hillside community of Lam Tin by a series of escalators.

== Livery ==
The station's livery is bright blue, as "Lam" is Cantonese for "blue".

== History ==
In the 1980s, the Eastern Harbour Crossing (EHC or EHT) was planned by the colonial government. Following the successful performance of the MTR since 1978, the government decided to extend the Kwun Tong line through a new tunnel to Quarry Bay.

It was later decided that before the entrance to the tunnel, trains would stop at a station in the Lam Tin Valley, where it goes into the Sai Tso Wan Hill and then underground to the entrance of the tunnel.

The station was opened on 1 October 1989. As part of his official visit to Hong Kong with Princess Diana, the Prince of Wales Charles (now Charles III) officiated the opening of the station, where a commemorative plaque remains on display.

After the opening of the EHC, Lam Tin, with the MTR station and bus terminals, became a crucial transport interchange in east Kowloon. The station serves passengers between Tseung Kwan O and other parts of Kowloon, as well as between Hong Kong and Kowloon.

Platform screen doors have been in use since late August 2005.

The EHC has now been taken over by the Tseung Kwan O line running from Po Lam/LOHAS Park to North Point. Passengers wanting to take the EHC from the Kwun Tong line now have to change trains at Yau Tong.

== Station layout ==
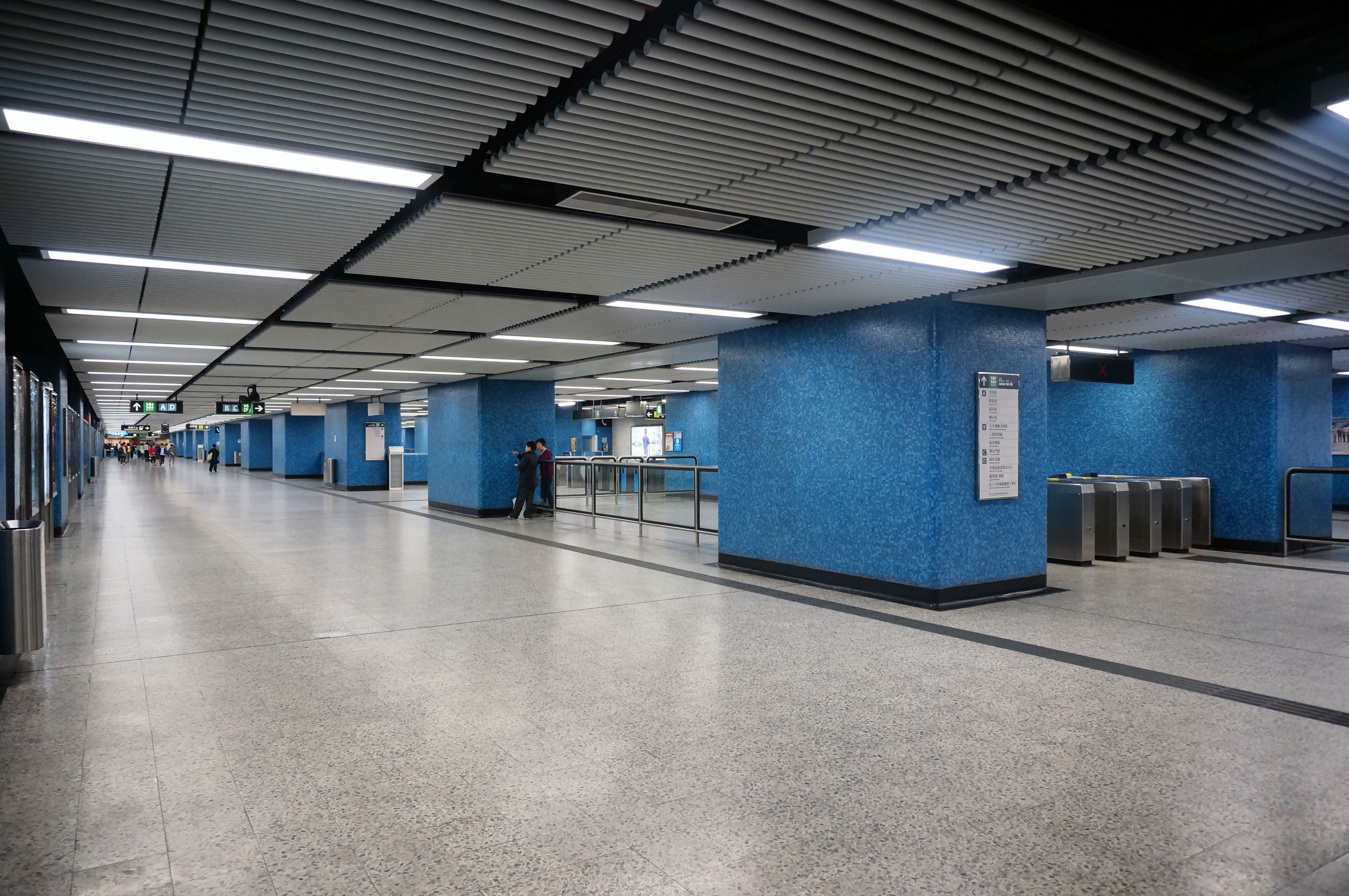
Lam Tin station concourse

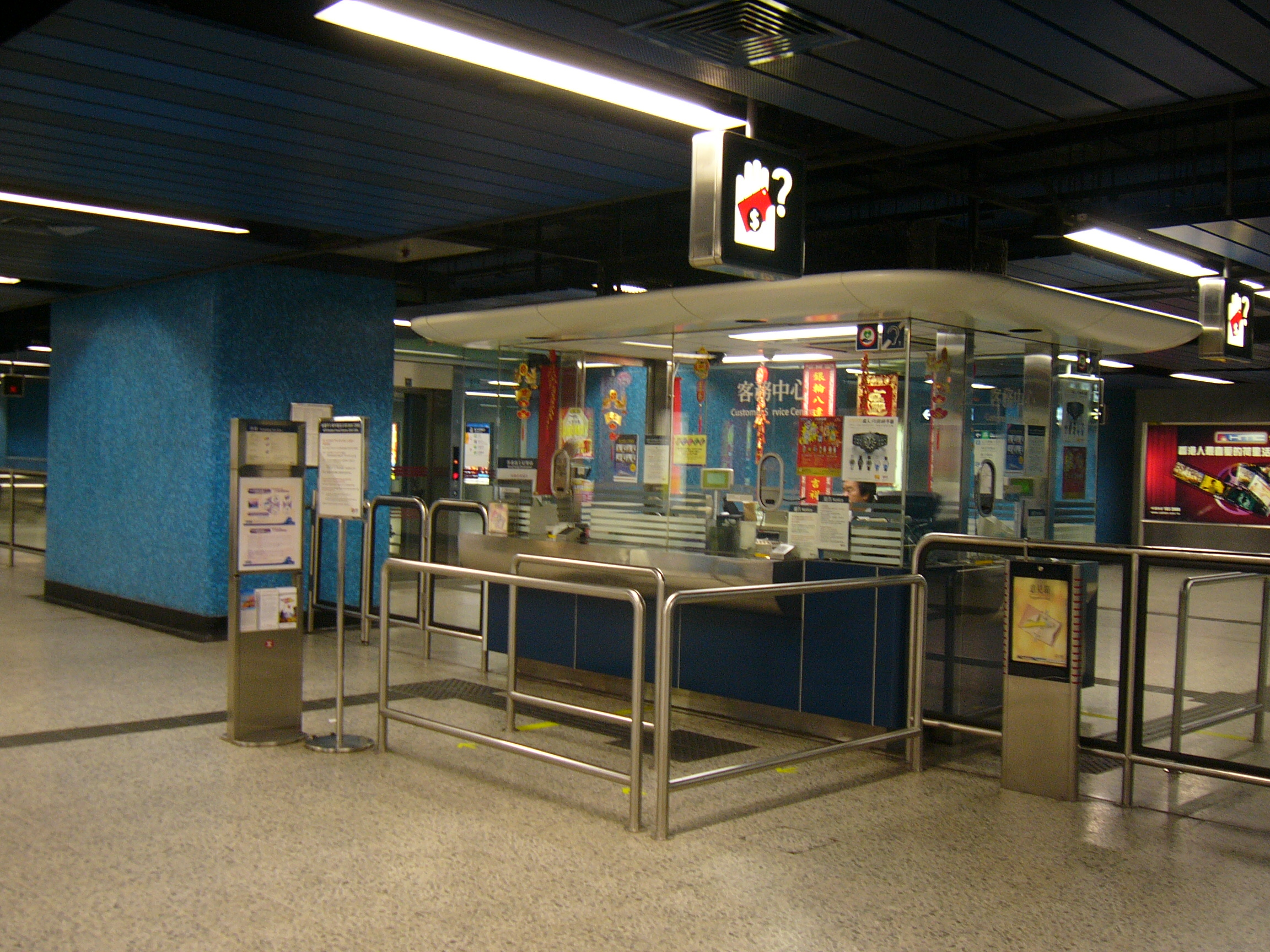
Customer service centre with only one operator serving both queues

Platforms 1 and 2 share the same island platform. Like Lai King station, Lam Tin station is built on an elevated platform, in which half of the platform is immersed into the Lam Tin Hill and so the station is sealed like other underground stations (but it is mixed as an elevated, ground level, and underground station).

The concourse is the first floor down the escalators from the hillside exits. It is divided into two parts: the paid area and the non-paid area. The paid area has escalators down to the platforms and has a postbox, while the non-paid area links the exits and houses a Hang Seng Bank branch.

Between the paid and non-paid areas there are the entrance gates and a customer service centre which serves both areas.

-	Subway (Kai Tin Road)	Subway to Kai Tin Road and Lam Tin North
G	Concourse	Exits, footbridges
G	Concourse	Customer service, MTRshops
G	Concourse	Hang Seng Bank, vending machines, automatic teller machines
G	Footbridge	Footbridge to Sceneway Garden
G	Footbridge	Transport interchange, subway to Kai Tin Road
L1; Platforms	Platform 1	Kwun Tong line towards Tiu Keng Leng (Yau Tong) →
L1; Platforms	Island platform, doors will open on the right
L1; Platforms	Platform 2	← Kwun Tong line towards Whampoa (Kwun Tong)

== Entrances/exits ==
- A: Kai Tin Road, Kai Tin Estate, Kai Tin Shopping Centre, Ping Tin Estate, Tak Tin Estate, Kwong Tin Estate
- B: Public Transport Interchange, Sceneway Plaza
- C: Lei Yue Mun Road
- D1: Sin Fat Road
- D2: Sceneway Garden

The station offers, on a trial basis, an accessible car service for passengers using wheelchairs. On demand, the service will transport the passengers from either exit A or D1 to exit C, which is accessible.

== Transport connections ==
Following the MTR station's opening in 1989, the area around Lam Tin station has been developed into a major transportation interchange in Hong Kong. The shopping centre and Sceneway Plaza above the transportation interchange adjacent to the station were built on a site that used to be occupied by a hillside squatter village.

The Lam Tin community has seen several rebuilding projects since the station was built. The interchange has brought in new residential and commercial demands in the community. The bus termini, the Lei Yue Mun Interchange, and other public transportation facilities transformed the Lam Tin area into an important transportation hub as well as a commercial and residential centre.
