= Lam Tin =

Lam Tin 藍田
- Area
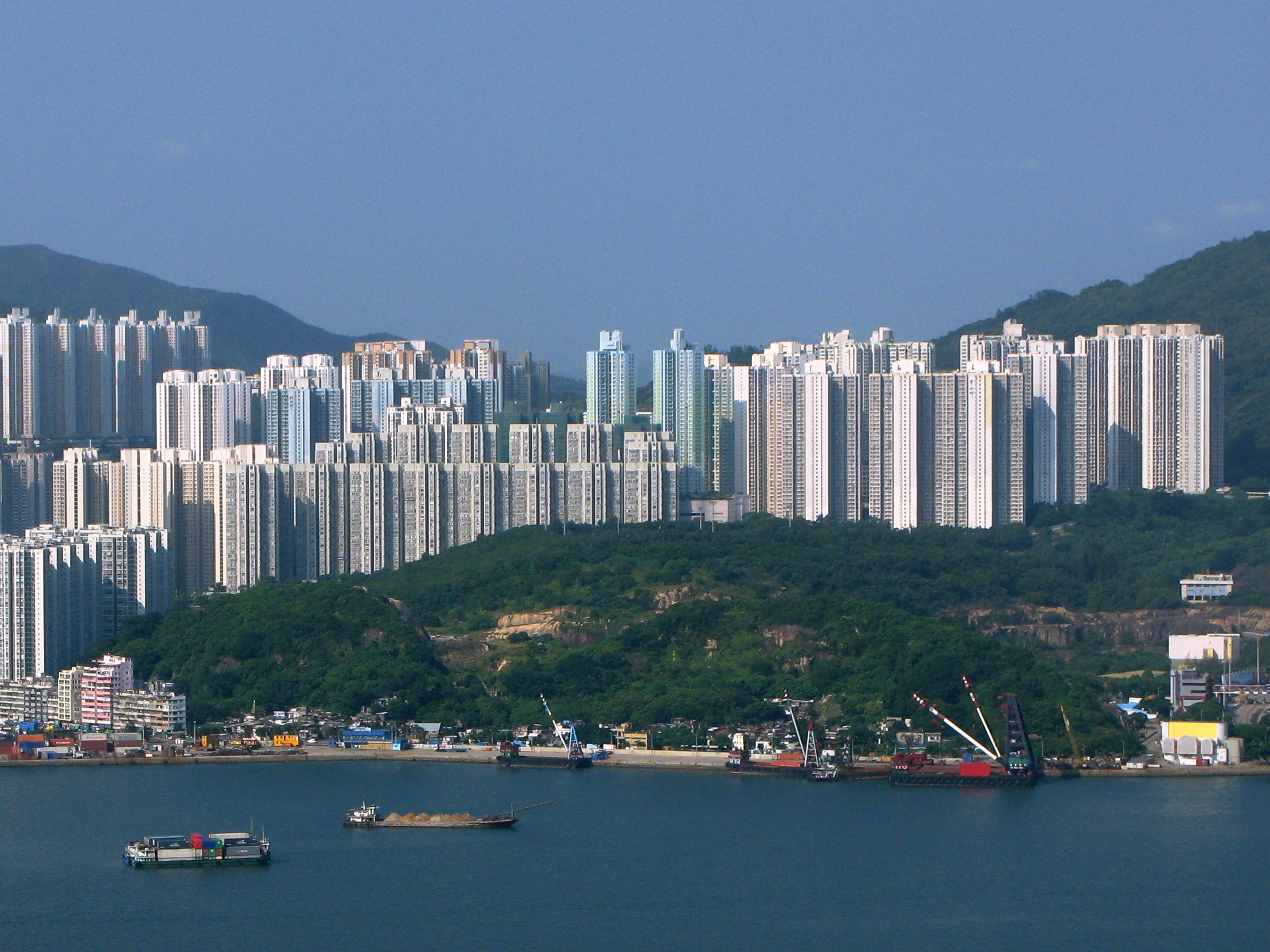
- Lam Tin Skyline

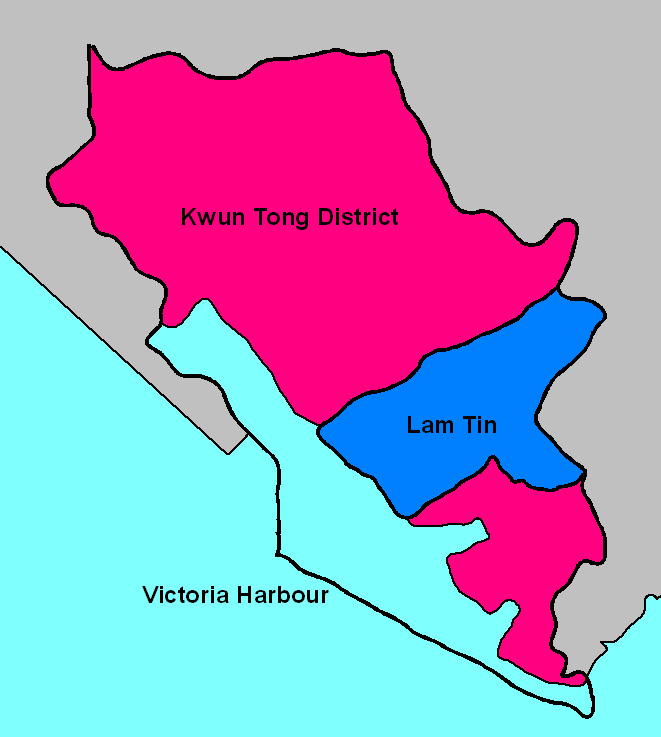
- Map showing Lam Tin's location in Kwun Tong District
- Coordinates: 22°18′34″N 114°14′10″E
- Country or territory: Hong Kong
- City: Kowloon
- Urban division: East Kowloon
- District: Kwun Tong
- First settled: c. 900 BC
- Incorporated into China: c. 200 BC
- Incorporated into Hong Kong: 1898

Area
  - Area: 2.184 km^{2} (0.843 sq mi)
  - Land: 2.184 km^{2} (0.843 sq mi)
  - Urban: 1.737 km^{2} (0.671 sq mi)
  - Metro: 1.334 km^{2} (0.515 sq mi)
- Elevation: 88 m (290 ft)

Population (2001)
  - Area: 131,000
  - Density: 59,985/km^{2} (155,360/sq mi)
  - Urban: 131,000
  - Urban density: 75,435/km^{2} (195,380/sq mi)
  - Metro: 128,600
  - Metro density: 96,399/km^{2} (249,670/sq mi)
- Time zone: UTC+8 (HKT)

Lam Tin
- Traditional Chinese: 藍田
- Simplified Chinese: 蓝田
- Cantonese Yale: làhm tìhn
- Literal meaning: blue-field
Transcriptions
Standard Mandarin
- Hanyu Pinyin: Lántián
Yue: Cantonese
- Yale Romanization: làhm tìhn
- Jyutping: laam4 tin4

Lam Tin is an area in the Kwun Tong District in southeastern New Kowloon, Hong Kong. Lam Tin is primarily a residential area but also hosts a major transport interchange and several shopping attractions. Lam Tin was once a large field in the vicinity of Kowloon Bay. During the Song dynasty, it was a site of salt production. Since the 1980s, a number of housing estates were constructed in Lam Tin.

A high-density residential district built on a coastal knoll, Lam Tin hosts residential housing estates, transport infrastructure, mass-transit facilities, shopping centres, recreational areas and many other buildings and structures. It is home to 130,000 residents, making up a fifth of Kwun Tong District's population.

== Geographical location ==
In common speech, the name Lam Tin in the past usually included the areas of Lei Yue Mun and Yau Tong. However, new infrastructure and housing estates that were built there are not now considered part of Lam Tin. Conventional boundaries of Lam Tin: west to Laguna City, southeast to Kwong Tin Estate, north to the entrance of Tseung Kwan O Tunnel, southwest to Victoria Harbour.

=== Geography ===
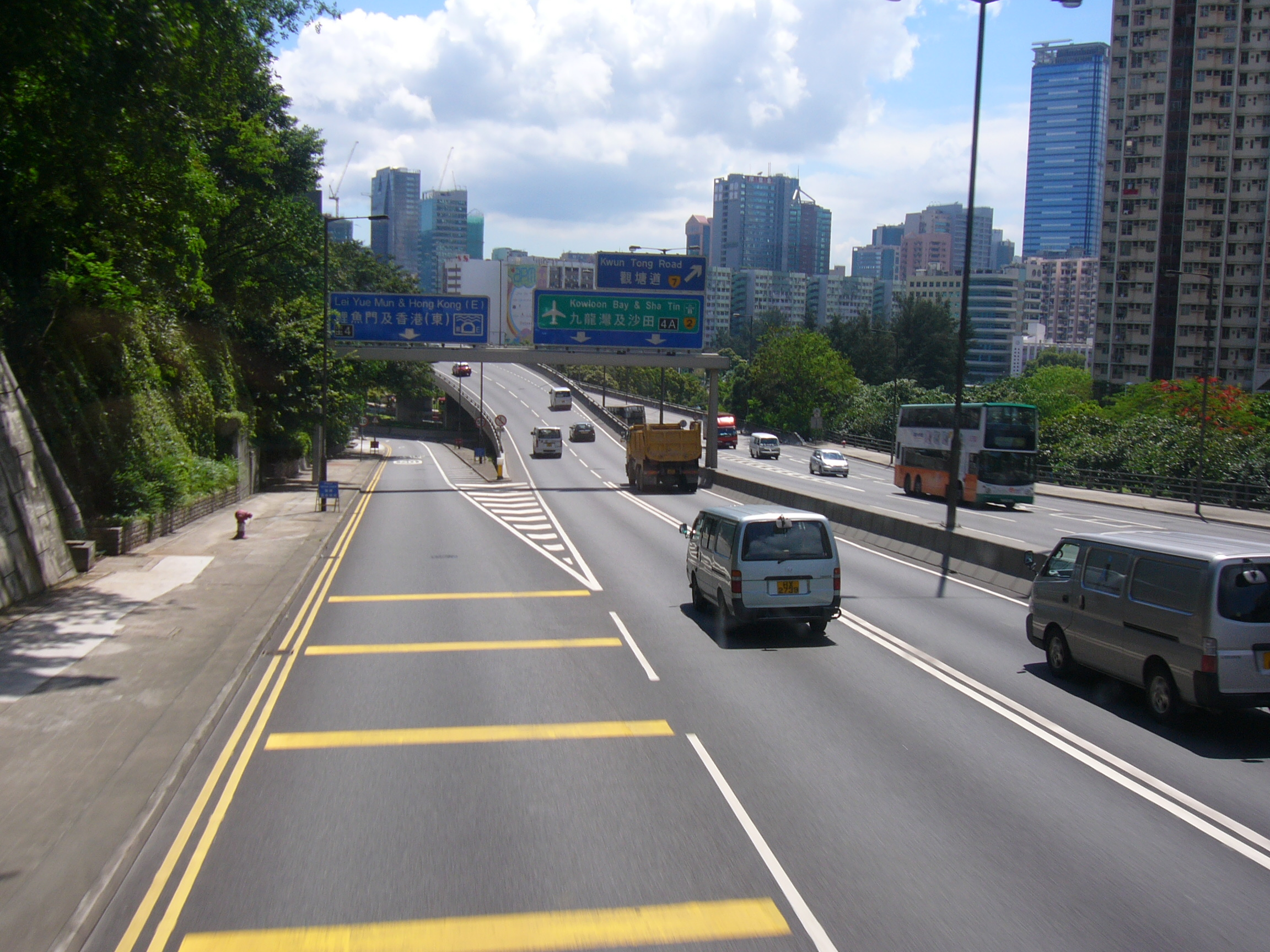
Tseung Kwan O Road, a main road marking the boundary of Lam Tin

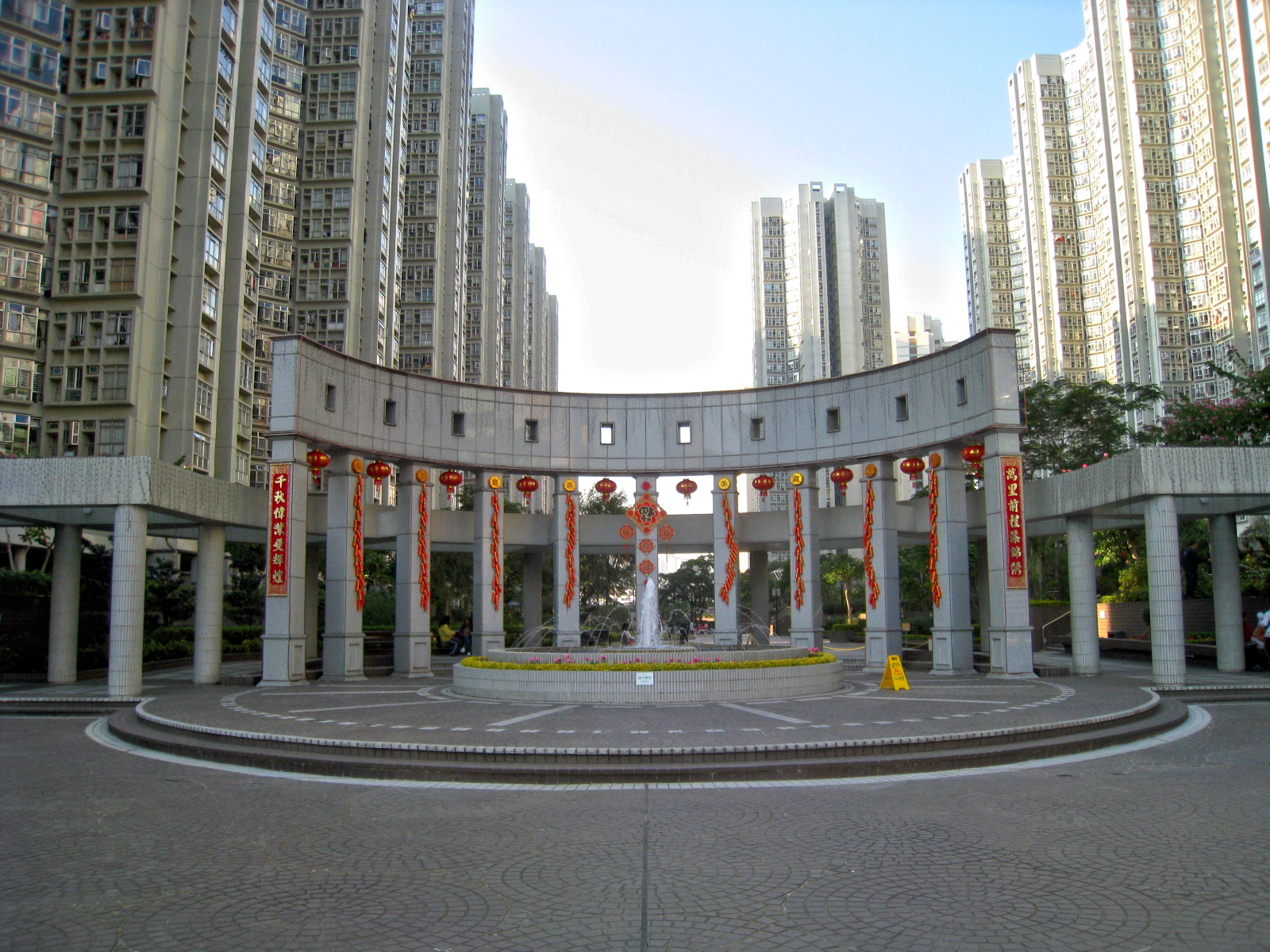
Sceneway Garden

Lam Tin is overlooked to the east by Black Hill, or Ng Kwai Shan. The rock below this locality is Hong Kong Granite from the Cretaceous period. Most granite rock in Lam Tin is medium-grained. The granite in Lam Tin is of the Lion Rock suite. Farther towards the shore, a small area of land to the west of Cha Kwo Ling was reclaimed.

=== Politics ===
The entire Lam Tin area is located in Kwun Tong District. Politically, Lam Tin is the name of a constituency of Kwun Tong District, which includes the area of the former Lam Tin Estate. However, in common speech, the name Lam Tin usually refers to a larger area which includes nine constituencies of Kwun Tong District.

Constituencies of the Kwun Tong District Council within the Lam Tin area

- J17 Kwong Tak (廣德)
- J18 Hing Tin (興田)
- J19 Lam Tin (藍田)
- J20 Ping Tin (平田)
- J21 Pak Nga (栢雅)
- J27 Laguna City (麗港城)
- J28 King Tin (景田)

== History ==
Located along the coast of southern China, Lam Tin was first settled around the 9th century BC by the Nanyue people. The Qin dynasty conquered the Nanyue in the late 3rd century BC as part of their unification of China. Since then, the land presently known as Lam Tin became identified as part of China.

Lam Tin, called Ham Tin Shan (鹹田山) at that time, literally meaning "salty field hill", had been part of Kowloon Bay salt-fields (九龍灣鹽田, also known as Guanfuchang 官富場) under the management of Dongguan County or Xin'an County in different dynasties. The salt-fields were first officially operated by the Song dynasty in 1163.

The Kowloon Bay salt-fields were rich in salt, and this brought wealth to the residents near the bay. Gradually, Ham Tin Shan became villages. Because of the region's shoreline location, agricultural activities started with the plantation of high-salinity crops. With a quarry found in So Mo Ping (now Sau Mau Ping), the region gradually became a small fishing, farming and quarrying town.

In 1662, the Kangxi Emperor moved all residents along southern China coastline inland by 50 Chinese miles and abandoned the salt-fields in hopes of weakening the pirate Zheng Chenggong's power through cutting his support from coastline residents. Although the residents were allowed to return in 1669, after the Kangxi Emperor discovered that the migration brought great economic harm, the salt industry in Ham Tin never prospered again.

In 1841, the British Empire acquired Hong Kong. The western half of the Kowloon Bay salt-fields becoming part of British Hong Kong in 1860 and the eastern half in 1898. In the 20th century, the salt-fields were abandoned for reclamation to facilitate the building of Kai Tak Airport. To reflect this change in land usage, Ham Tin was renamed Lam Tin of similar pronunciation because the village no longer produced salt. The name Lam Tin came from Lantian, Shaanxi, which came from a phrase "藍田生玉", literally "produced from the blue fields is jade". The name Lam Tin was officially endorsed on 1 September 1970.

The colonial government built Lam Tin Estate in the 1960s to settle low-income residents during the influx of population from mainland China after the Korean War. Gradually, Lam Tin became a common term to Hongkongers describing the areas around Lam Tin Estate. The dragon emblem painted on Block 15 of Lam Tin Estate was a symbol of Lam Tin's unity until the building's demolition in 1998. Much of Lam Tin Estate's footprint was absorbed by newer public housing estates.

With the building of three major transport structures in the late 20th century – the Kwun Tong Bypass, the Eastern Harbour Crossing, and the MTR – Lam Tin became even more interconnected with the rest of Hong Kong, spurring a population surge in the district and becoming a major transport interchange. This is further augmented by the opening of Tseung Kwan O–Lam Tin Tunnel in 2022.

== Housing ==
The first modern housing estate in Lam Tin was Lam Tin Estate. The estate was built in the 1960s and the 1970s to settle the influx of mainland immigrants. The late 1980s saw the district's first private residential buildings. Various facilities built during the 1990s made Lam Tin a compact residential area, however Lam Tin Estate was demolished in the 1990s and was redeveloped, with most of its footprint absorbed into Kai Tin Estate, On Tin Estate, and Ping Tin Estate; a small section retained the name Lam Tin Estate.

Most of the residents in Lam Tin are Chinese, but due to an influx of Japanese immigrants during the 1990s, people of Japanese descent have become common in Lam Tin, particularly in Sceneway Garden and Laguna City, which now features a Japanese kindergarten.

=== Lam Tin Estate ===
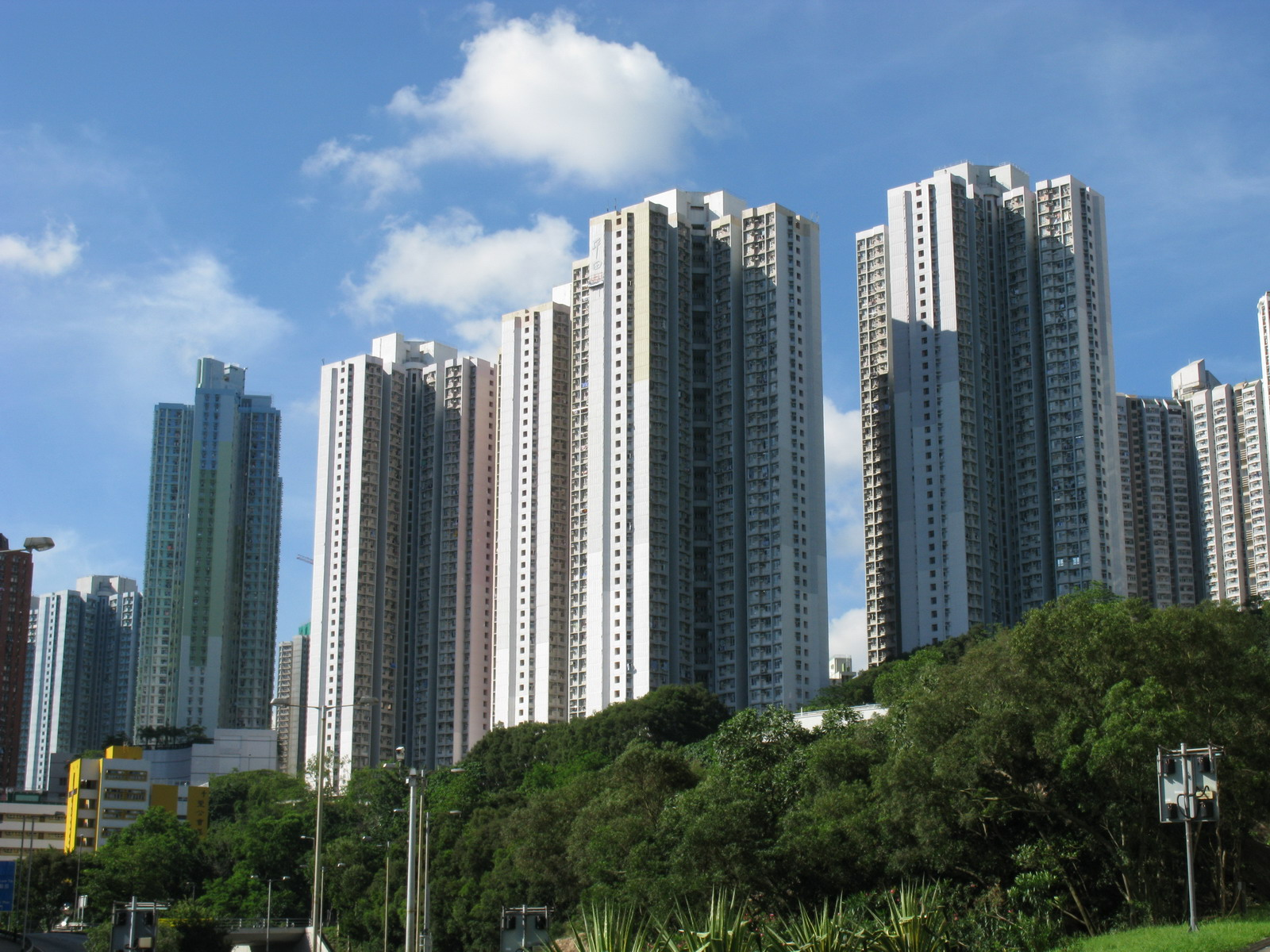
High-rise buildings on land originally occupied by Lam Tin Estate

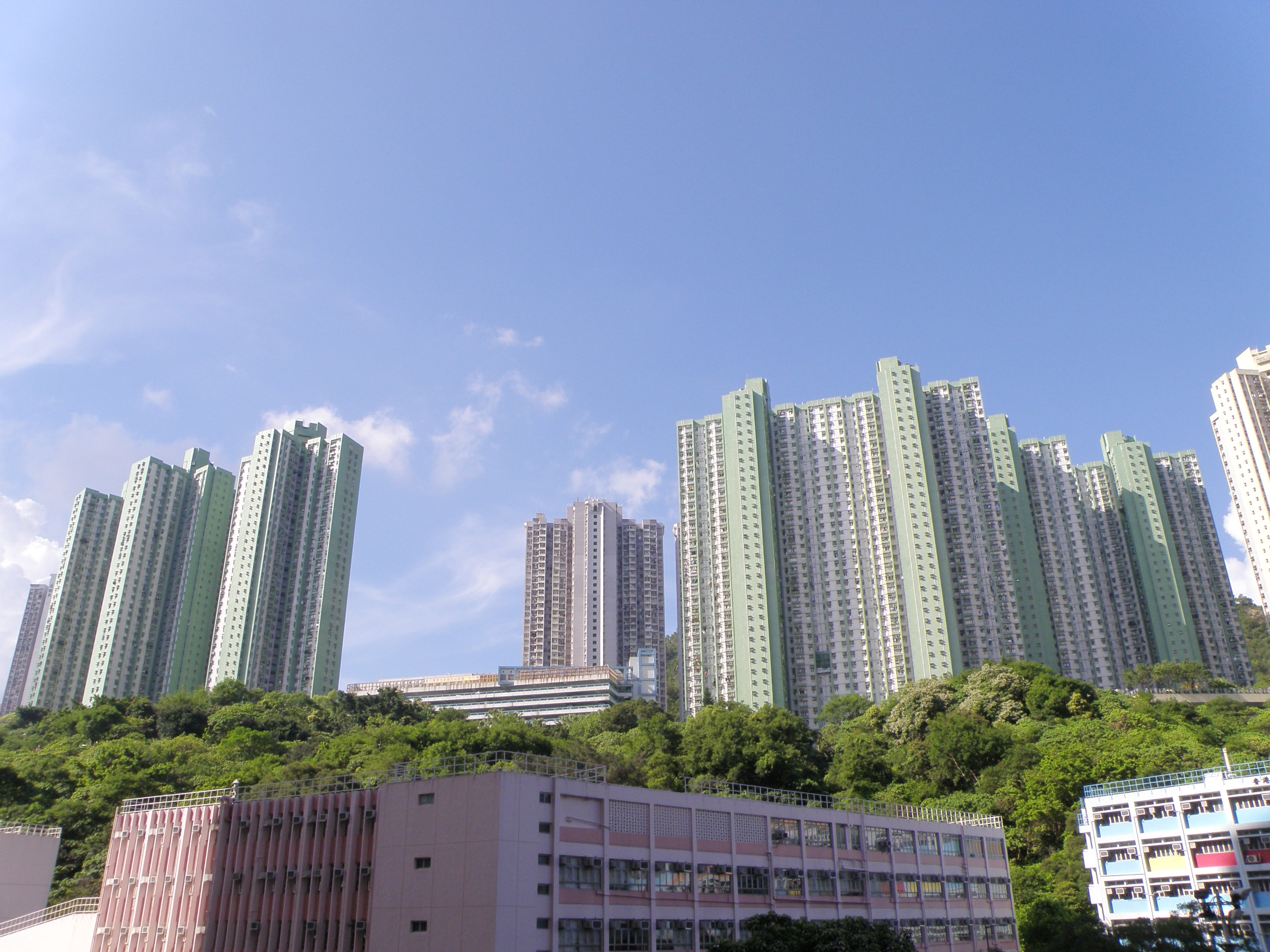
Hong Pak Court

Lam Tin Estate consisted of tower blocks numbered 1 to 24. Blocks 1 to 14 of Lam Tin Estate were built between 1962 and 1965 as type 4 public housing buildings (第四型公屋); the other 10 towers were built between 1969 and 1975 as type 6 public housing buildings (第六型公屋). There was no Block 9, leaving the number of buildings in Lam Tin Estate at 23.

The Chinese dragon, which has symbolised unity of Chinese people since it was the first national emblem of unified China, is painted in multicolour on Block 15's south and north facing walls because it was the 500th public housing building in Hong Kong. Block 15's distinctive imagery made it a recognisable symbol of Lam Tin and the district's unity. After demolition and reconstruction, Block 15 became part of Ping Tin Estate.

Building structure of Lam Tin Estate's blocks is standardised by the government. As types 3, 4 and 6 buildings, the 23 towers of Lam Tin Estate were shaped as cuboids and resembled candy-boxes standing on a knoll. Most buildings were 16-storeys high and housed about 800 units.

Each building had an estimated capacity of 3,000 residents and an approximate space allocation at 30 ft^{2} per person. Bathrooms and kitchens were combined into one compartment, as were living rooms and bedrooms. Lifts only reached some of the floors. To access the other floors, one needed to exit the lift at a level nearby and hike upstairs or downstairs. On the ground floor beneath the buildings were a variety of shops which served the residents. Although densely packed, the living environment of Lam Tin Estate fostered close relationships in the neighbourhood.

Owing to the ageing of buildings, the reconstruction of Lam Tin Estate was announced in September 1995 as part of an urban renewal project. Demolition started in 1997 and was completed in 2002. After reconstruction, Lam Tin Estate became Kai Tin Estate, Tak Tin Estate, Ping Tin Estate and Hong Yat Court.

=== Laguna City and Sceneway Garden ===
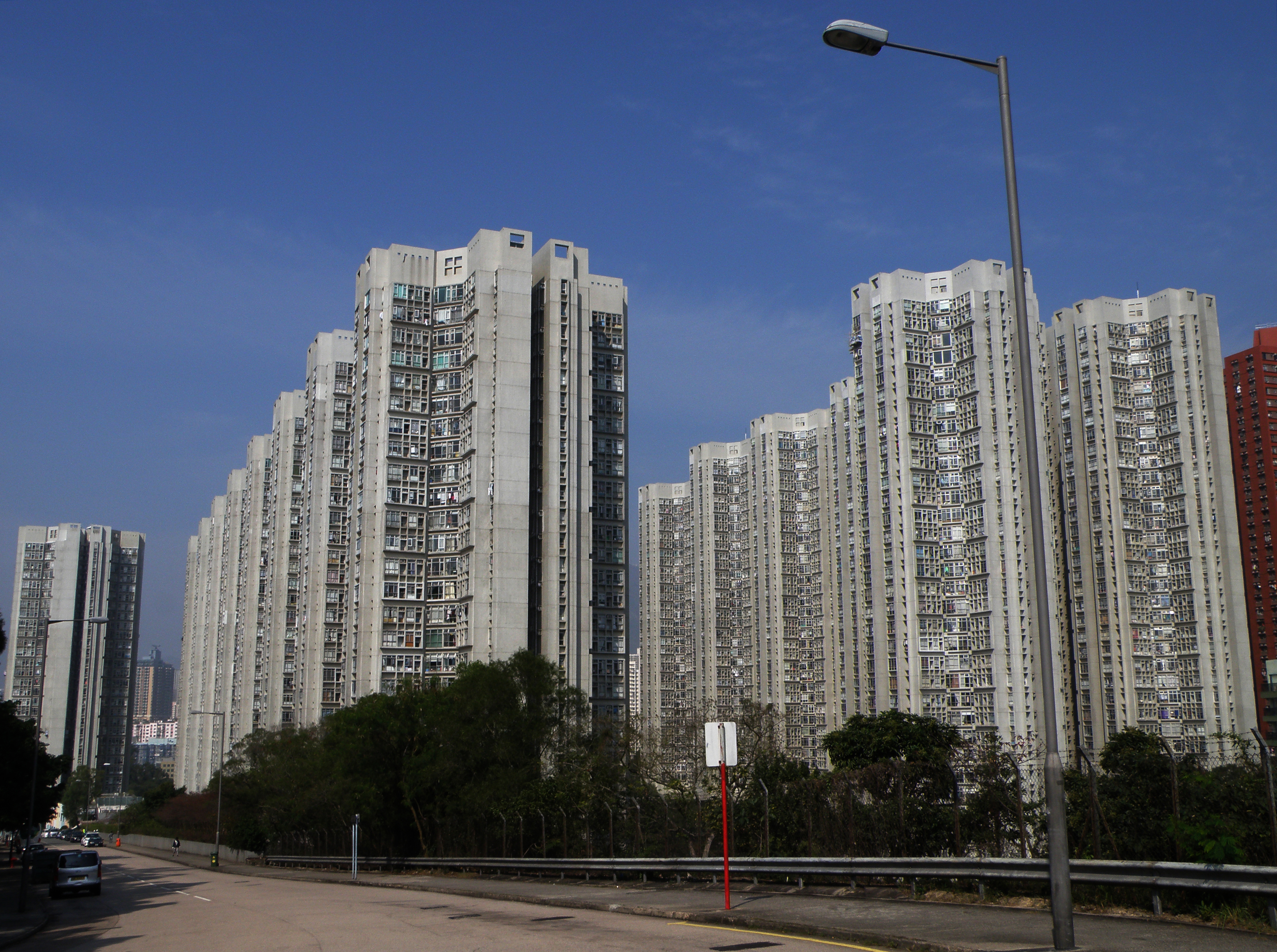
Sceneway Garden

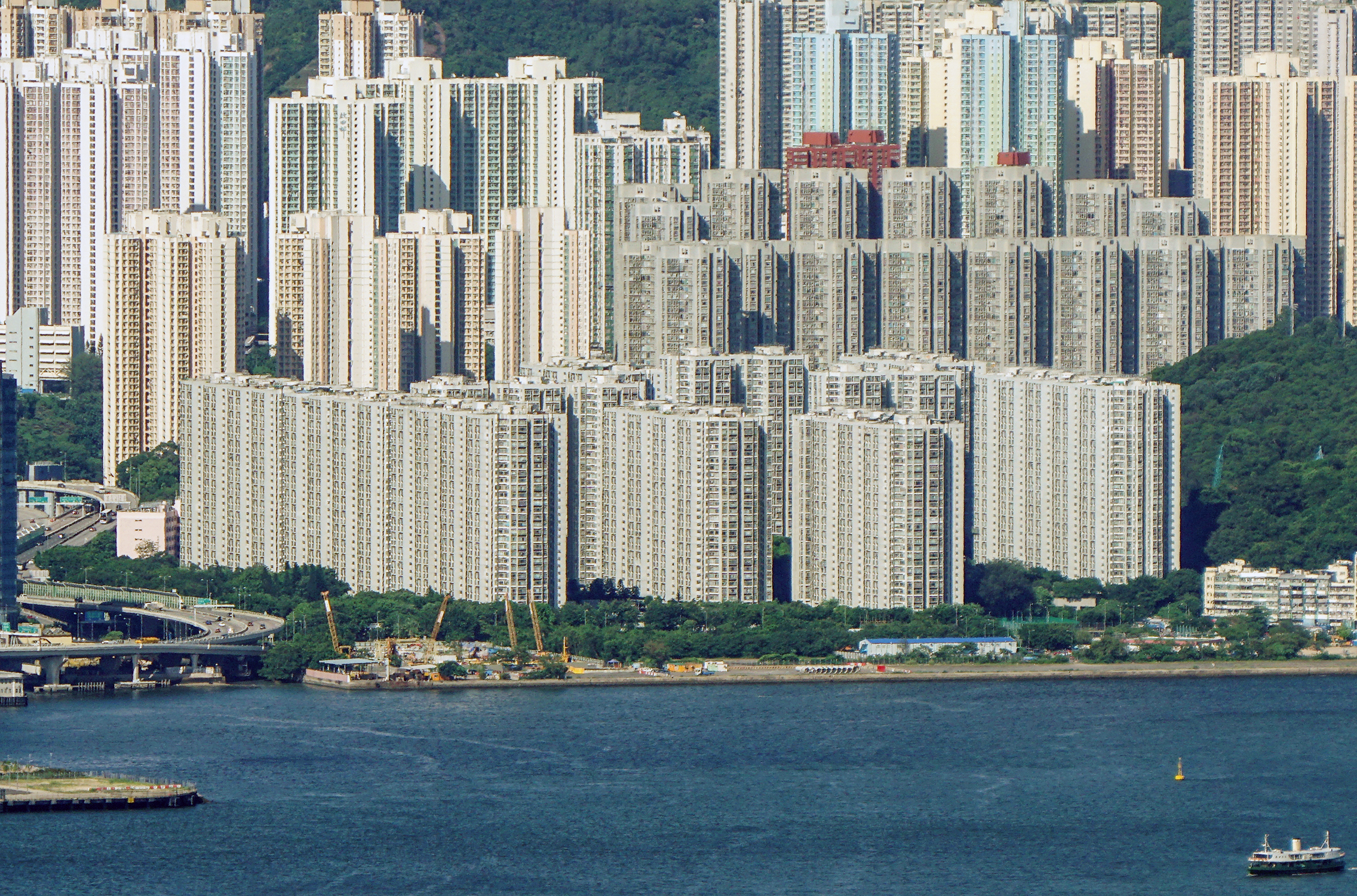
Laguna City

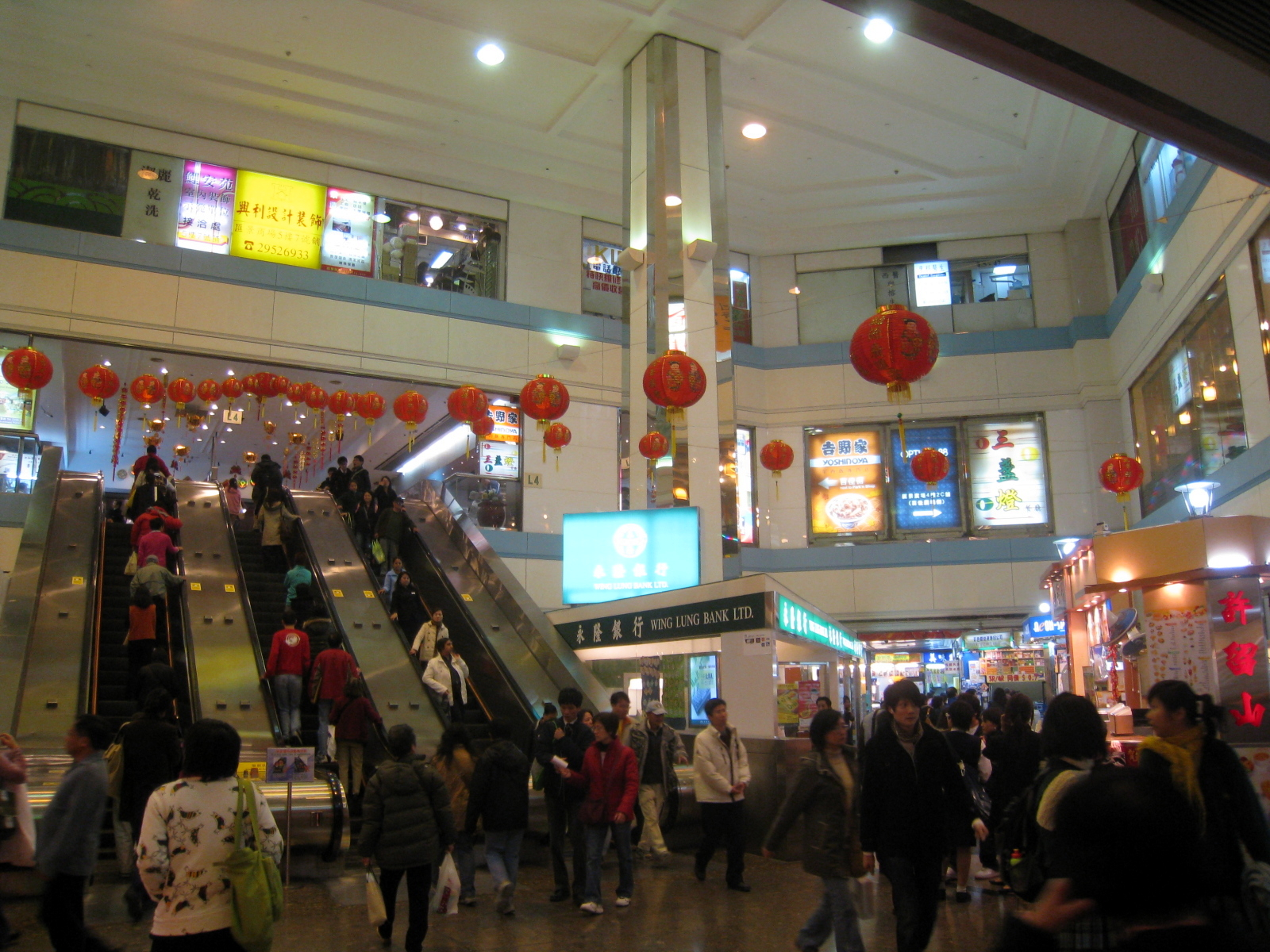
Sceneway Plaza

Laguna City and Sceneway Garden were the earliest large-scale private-housing estates built in Lam Tin. Both were built by Cheung Kong Holdings and completed in the early 1990s.

In the late 1980s, Cheung Kong acquired two pieces of land in Lam Tin, one being a former Shell oil depot, the other above the newly built Lam Tin MTR station and bus terminus, and developed them into Laguna City and Sceneway Garden respectively. Laguna City was completed in 1991 and Sceneway Garden was completed in 1992.

Sceneway Garden is built on the podium above Lam Tin station. The podium was built in a valley between Cha Kwo Ling and Lam Tin Hill, which hosted a waste-car dump-site before its construction. It has a total of 17 towers and a gross floor area of 280,760 m^{2}. There are altogether 4112 flats housing approximately 20,000 people. It also has two carparks, one for residents and one for visitors. Built together with Sceneway Garden was Sceneway Plaza, which is a major shopping mall in southeastern Kowloon.

Laguna City is built along Lam Tin's waterfront taking over the land from the former oil depot. Part of Laguna City is built on reclaimed land. Laguna City consists of four phases, totalling 38 towers upon its 1991 completion. Built together with Laguna City was Laguna Park, which was completed in 1994 and then handed over to Urban Council. Laguna Park has a total area of 320,000 sq ft (30,000 m^{2}). Phases 1, 2 and 4 of Laguna City are managed by the same company, while phase 3 has an independent management authority. Similarly, phases 1, 2 and 4 share the same owners' committee, whereas phase 3 has its own.

=== List of villages and housing estates in Lam Tin ===
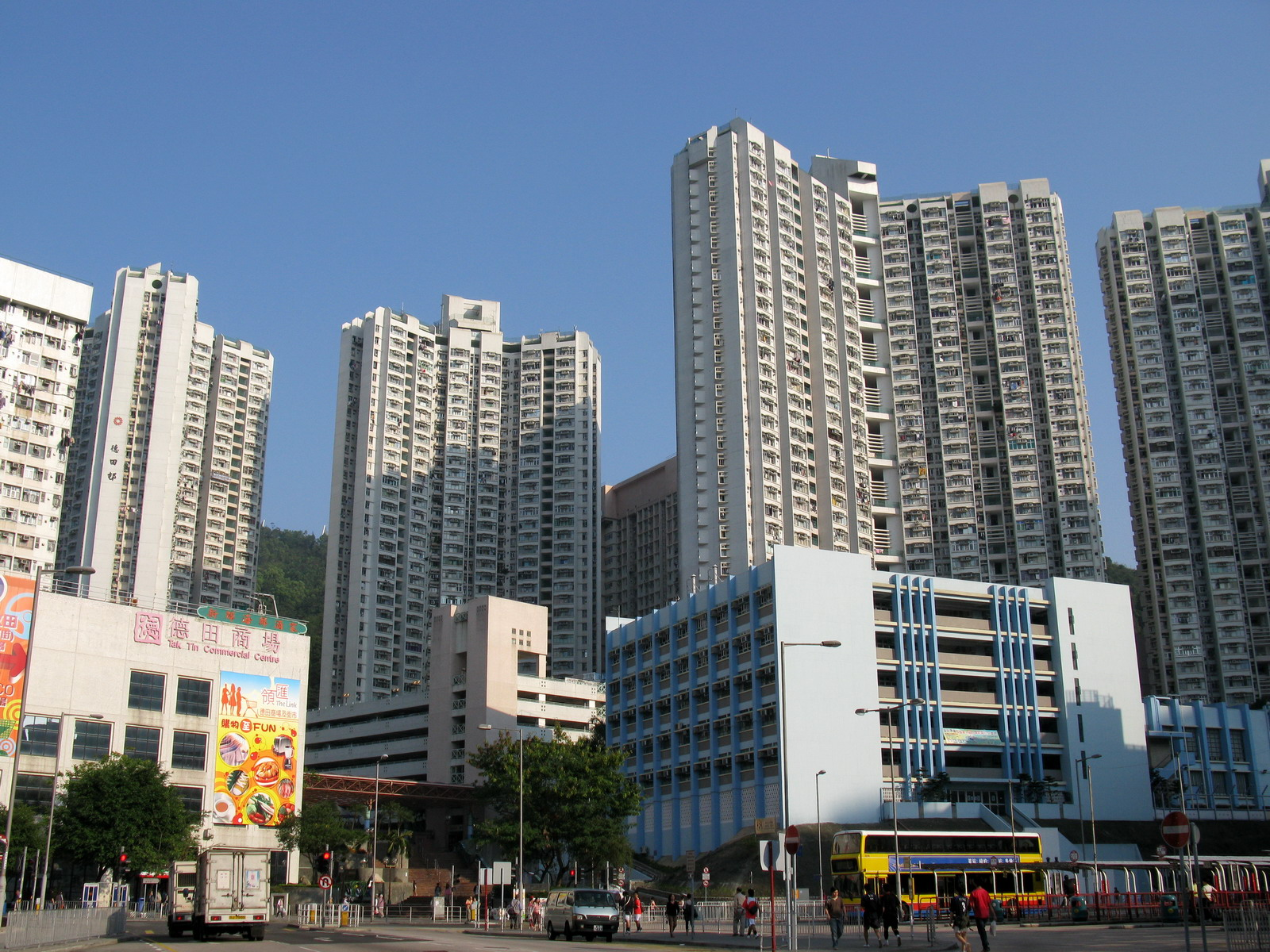
Tak Tin Estate

- Cha Kwo Ling Village
- Hing Tin Estate
- Hong Nga Court
- Hong Pak Court
- Hong Shui Court
- Hong Tin Court
- Hong Wah Court
- Hong Yat Court
- Hong Ying Court
- Kai Tin Estate
- Kai Tin Tower
- Kwong Tin Estate
- Laguna City
- Lam Tin Estate
- Lei On Court
- Ping Tin Estate
- Sceneway Garden
- Tak Tin Estate

In addition, Ko Chun Court and Ko Yee Estate in Yau Tong and Ma Yau Tong Village in Tiu Keng Leng are sometimes considered part of Lam Tin.

== Facilities ==
Being a compact residential area, Lam Tin has various facilities to satisfy its residents' daily needs. These include shopping malls, recreational facilities, water and other supplies. Furthermore, during the 1970s and 1980s, Lam Tin hosted landfills.

=== Shopping ===
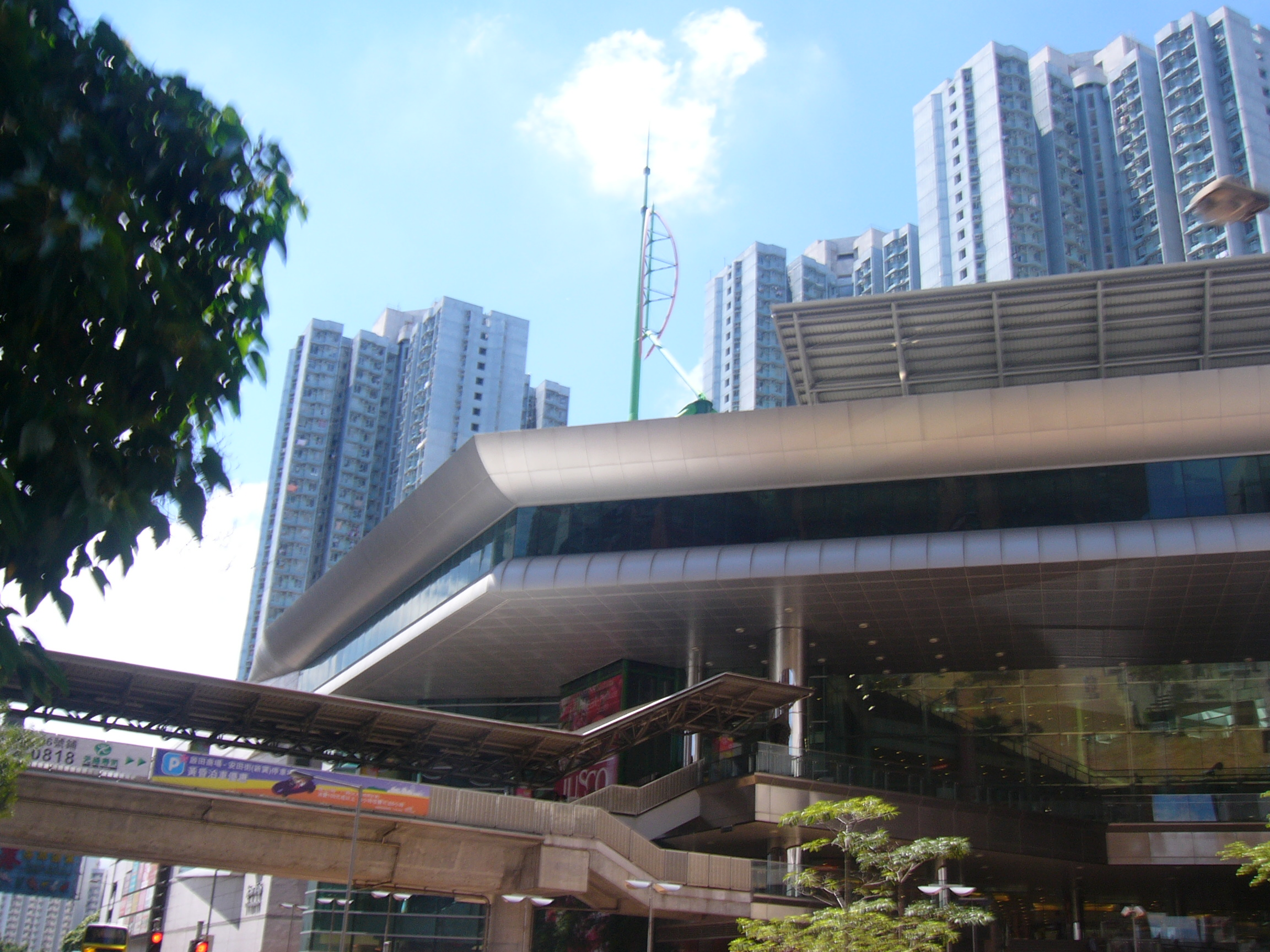
Kai Tin Estate and Shopping Centre

To meet the daily demands of its residents, Lam Tin hosts a number of shopping malls and markets. Most residential estates host individual shopping malls, and some of them have wet markets in addition to malls. These include:

- Hing Tin Commercial Centre
- Kai Tin Shopping Centre
- Kwong Tin Market
- Kwong Tin Shopping Centre
- Laguna Arcade
- Laguna Plaza
- Man Yau Market
- Ping Tin Shopping Centre
- Sceneway Plaza
- Tak Tin Estate Market
- Tak Tin Shopping Centre

=== Schools ===
To serve its residents, Lam Tin has a number of schools. They include kindergartens, primary schools and secondary schools. Some schools in Lam Tin are subsidised, others are private.

Lam Tin is in Primary One Admission (POA) School Net 48. Within the school net are multiple aided schools (operated independently but funded with government money) and Kwun Tong Government Primary School.

List of schools in Lam Tin

- Cannan International Kindergarten
- Creative Day Nursery
- Five Districts Business Welfare Association Szeto Ho Secondary School
- Hong Kong Society for the Protection of Children Mr. & Mrs. Thomas Tam Nursery School
- Lam Tin Methodist Primary School
- Nord Anglia International School Hong Kong
- OISCA H.K. Japanese Kindergarten (Kowloon)
- Princess Alexandra Red Cross Residential School
- SKH Kei Hau Secondary School
- SKH Lee Shiu Keung Primary School
- SKH Tak Tin Lee Shiu Keung Primary School
- St. Edward's Catholic Primary School
- St. Paul's School (Lam Tin)
- The Evangelical Lutheran Church of Hong Kong Ling on Kindergarten
- Think International Kindergarten

=== Recreation ===
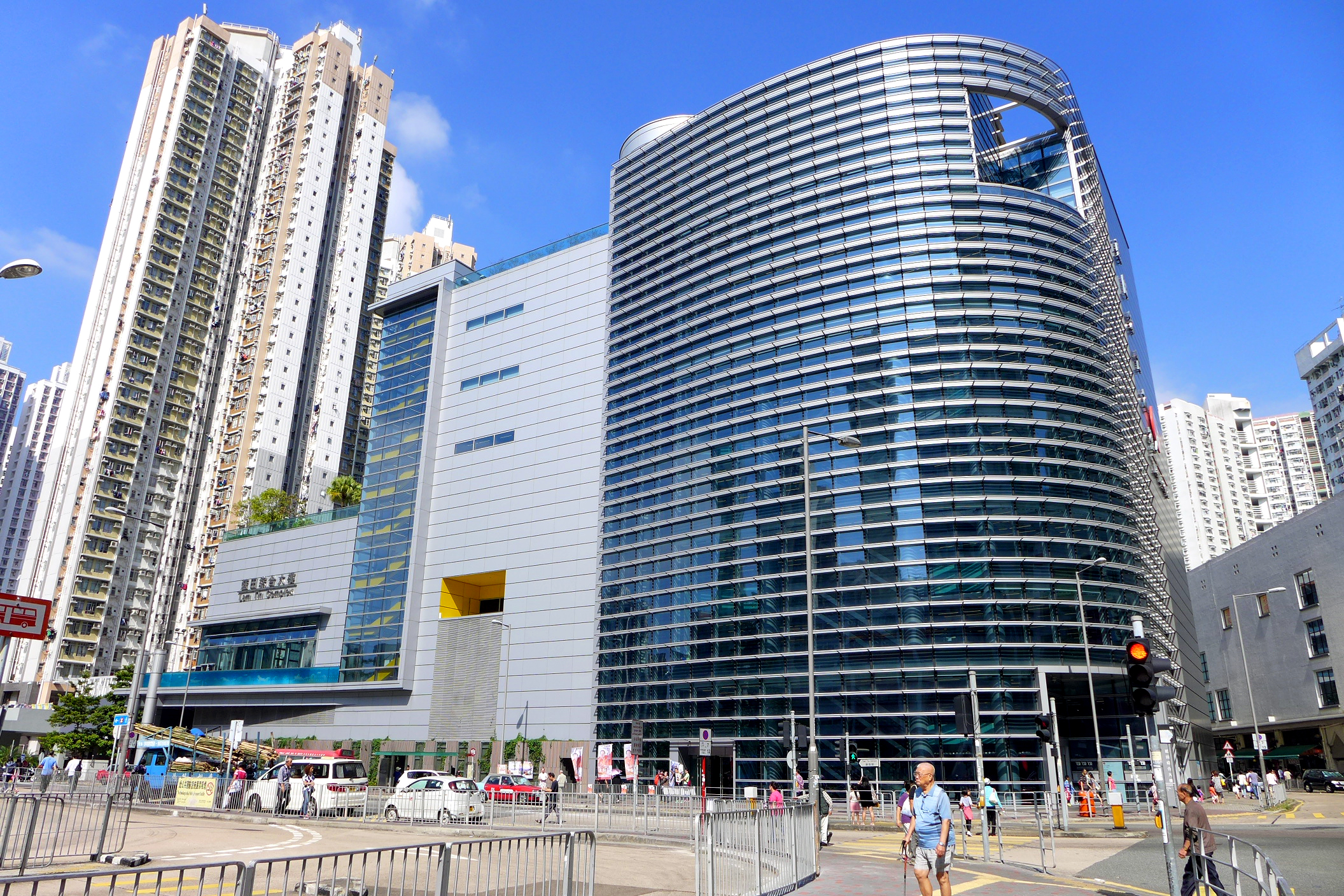
Lam Tin Complex

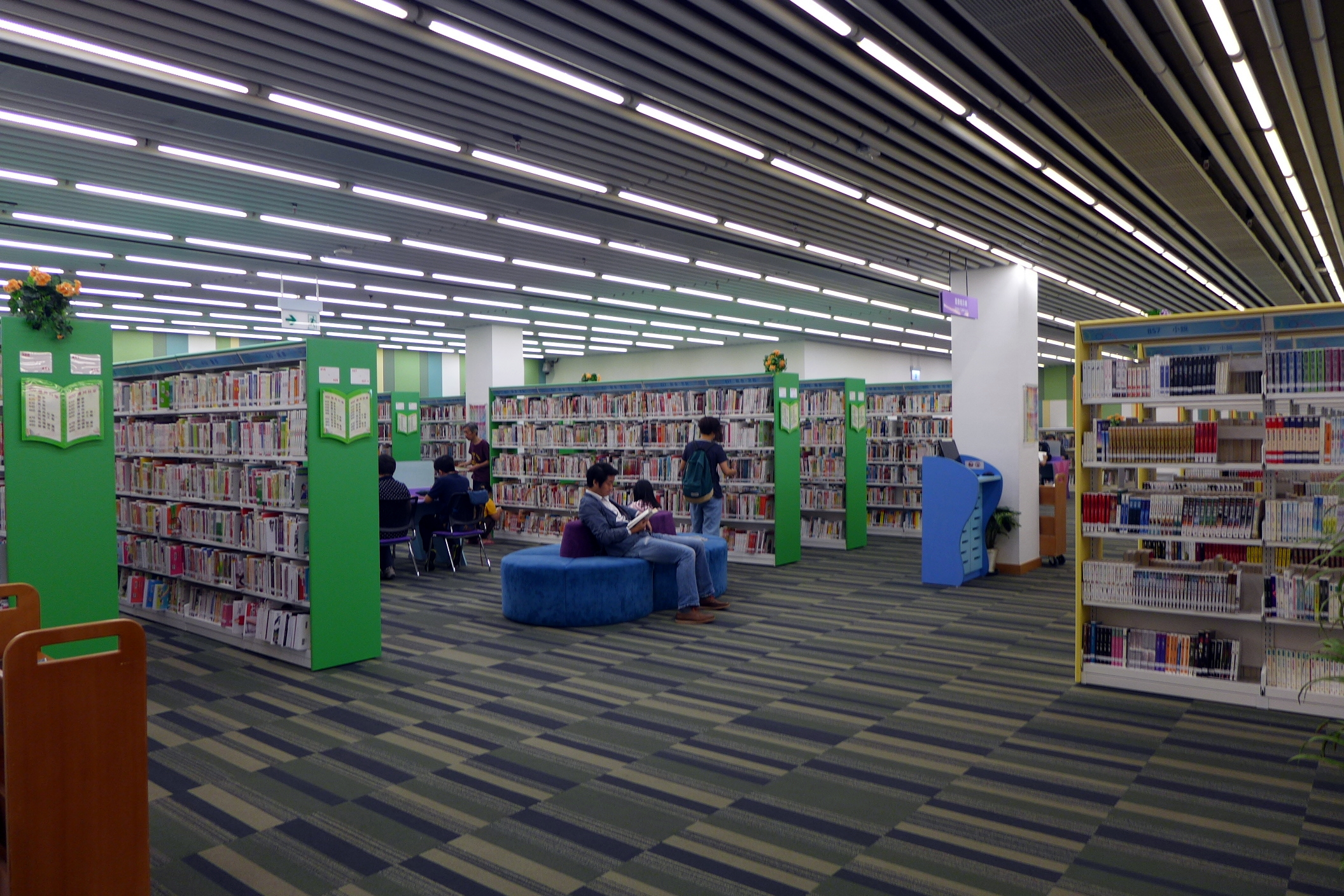
Lam Tin Public Library

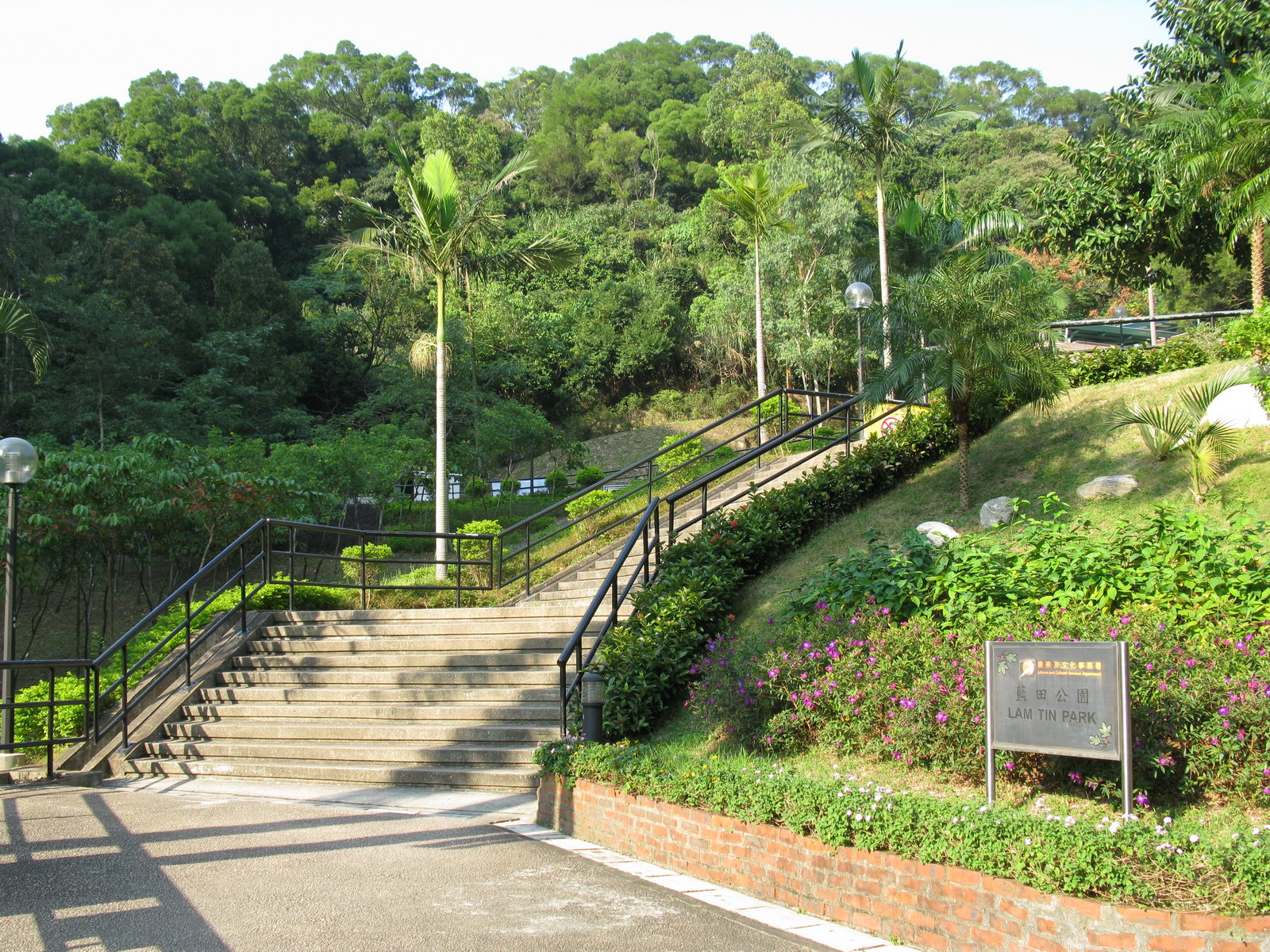
Lam Tin Park

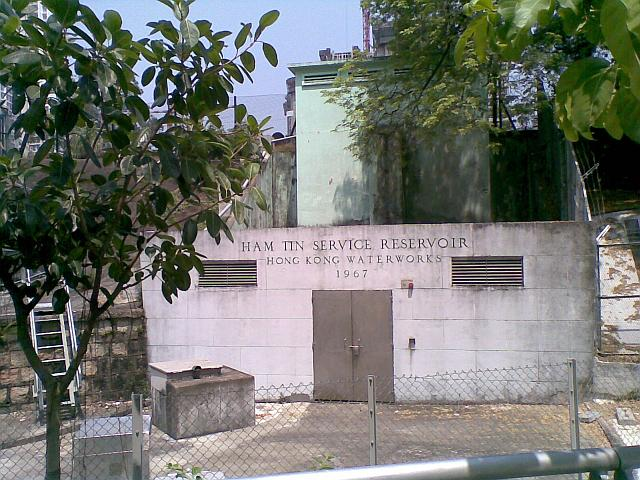
Ham Tin Service Reservoir

Lam Tin has a number of public parks, recreation grounds and indoor sports centres for its residents' use, including Lam Tin Park and Sai Tso Wan Recreation Ground. It is also home to part of the Wilson Trail. There are also a few government indoor activity centres, including Lam Tin West Community Centre, Lam Tin South Indoor Sports Ground and Lam Tin Complex, as well as a number of private recreational facilities.

Lam Tin Park was built along Black Hill in 1991 to serve the needs of the fast-growing community. It consists mainly of hiking trails and walkways, with a 5-a-side football pitch and a children's playground. It also serves as an entrance to the Wilson Trail. The whole of Lam Tin and Victoria Harbour can be viewed from the lookout point at the peak of Lam Tin Park.

Sai Tso Wan Recreation Ground was built between 1995 and 2004 over the former Sai Tso Wan Landfill. During the construction, the former landfill underwent a series of restoration works. A final capping layer was added to prevent leakage; a landfill gas control system was used to deploy methane from the decomposed rubbish as fuel, and a leachate management system was built to collect leachate for further processing. The recreation ground started its operation on 30 April 2004.

The Lam Tin Complex on 1 Hing Ting Street was built between 2009 and 2013. The facilities of the complex includes two indoor swimming pools (25x25 and 25x10 metres respectively), the Kwun Tong Music Centre, a self-study room, rooftop gardens, and the new two-floor Lam Tin Public Library, which relocated from smaller premises in Tak Tin Estate.

Besides recreation grounds, Lam Tin also hosts Stage 3 of Wilson Trail. The section starts at Exit A of Lam Tin MTR station, runs east along Kai Tin Road and Lei Yue Mun Road, up Black Hill along the road towards Junk Bay Chinese Permanent Cemetery, west along the Black Hill, and finally leaves Lam Tin near Ma Yau Tong towards the section's terminus at Tseng Lan Shue.

=== Supplies ===
Lam Tin has an underground network of safe water, town gas and domestic electricity supplies. Electricity in the area is served by China Light and Power. Town gas in the area is served by the Towngas Company.

The entire Lam Tin area is served by both tap water and flushing sea water supplies. The tap water is piped either from surface water or Dongjiang River into two service reservoirs and then pumped to individual households. The two service reservoirs that serve Lam Tin are Lam Tin Low Level Fresh Water Service Reservoir and Lam Tin High Level Service Reservoir. Built together with Lam Tin Estate, the low level reservoir is covered with a concrete-surfaced football field. The reservoir is now located between Kai Tin Estate and Tak Tin Estate, and serves as an open-air playground of local interest. The high level reservoir, on the other hand, is farther away from residential estates. It is located near Lam Tin Park, on the slope of Black Hill.

=== Waste disposal ===
From 1978 to 1981, Sai Tso Wan Landfill (晒草灣堆填區) served East Kowloon. Approximately 1.6 million tonnes of domestic waste and commercial waste were dumped in the site during its four-year operation. The disposed waste stacked up to 65 metres high. After its closure in 1981, it was sealed with soil and planted over with Grasslands and trees. Sin Fat Road, which runs up the hill and hosts Sceneway Garden Minibus Terminus, was constructed. Sai Tso Wan Landfill was later rebuilt into Sai Tso Wan Recreation Ground.

An area in Ma Yau Tong near today's Lam Tin Park was known as Ma Yau Tong Central Landfill (馬游塘中堆填區). The area measured 10.87 hectares (26.9 acres), and operated until 1986 when it became the last urban landfill to be closed, after which it was sealed and converted to government-owned grassland.

Since the total closure of urban landfills in 1986, rubbish from Lam Tin is first transferred to a treatment plant in Kowloon Bay where it is compressed, and then to South East New Territories Landfill (新界東南堆填區) where it is disposed of.

== Transport ==
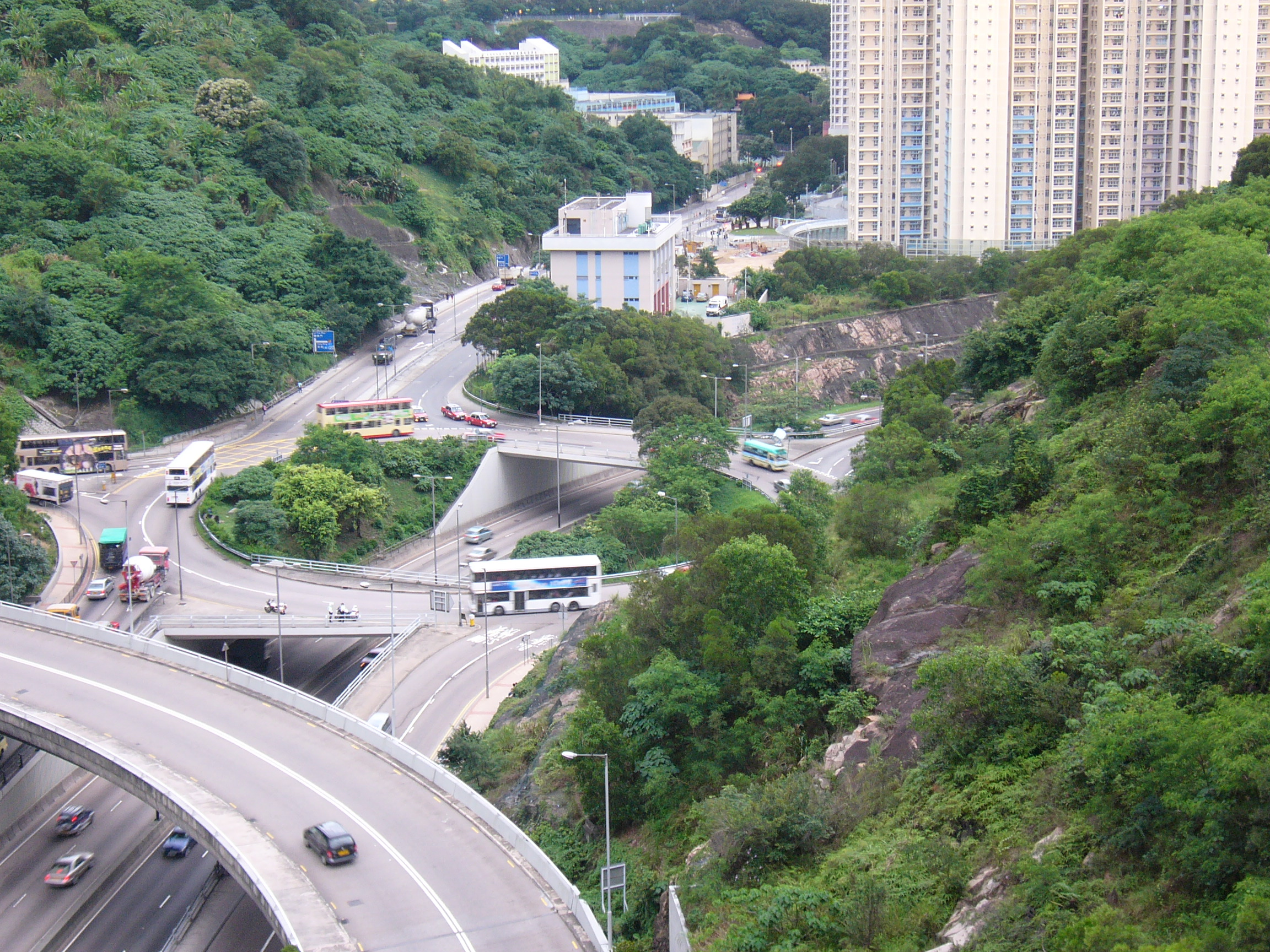
Lei Yue Mun Interchange

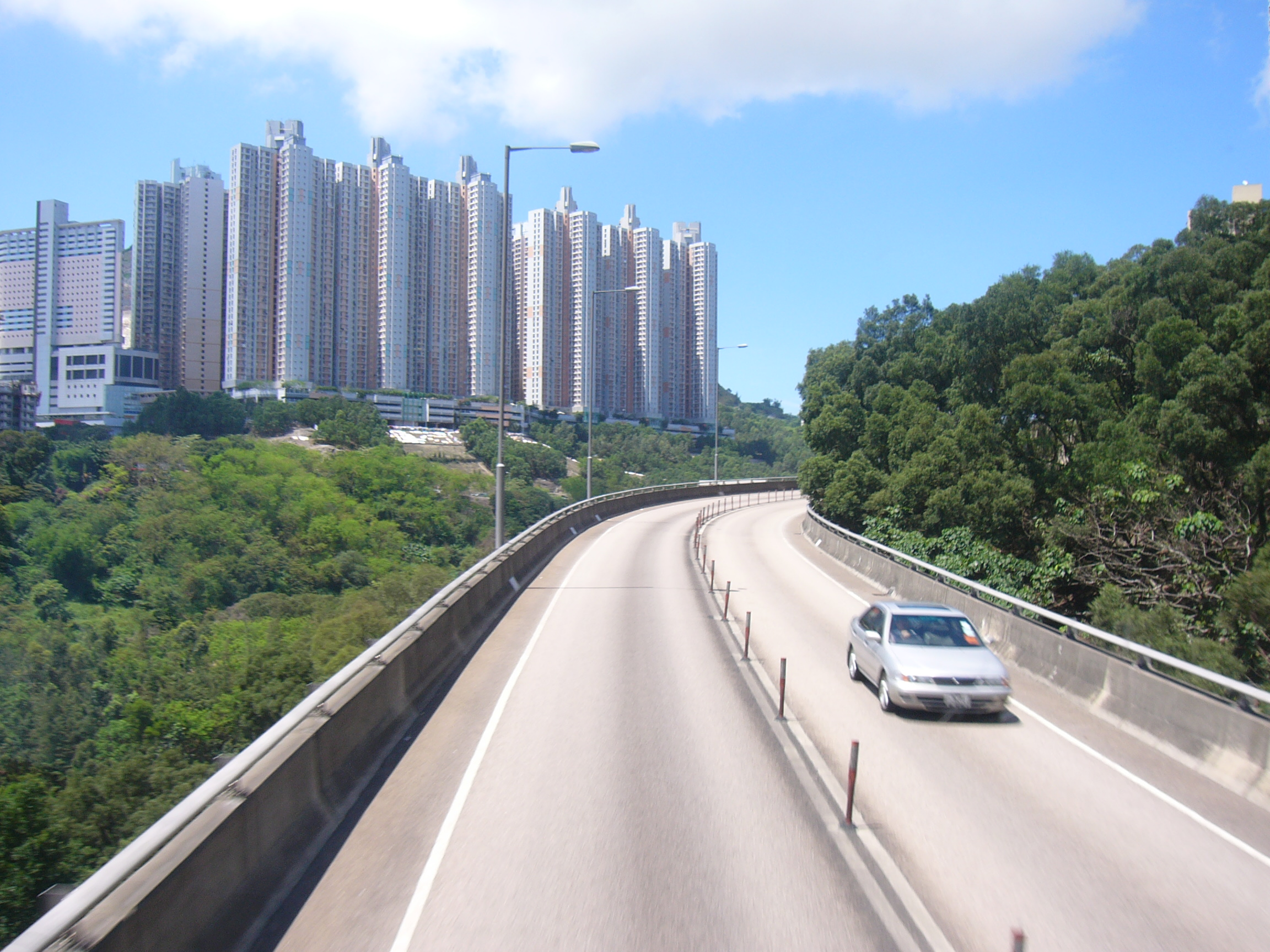
Lin Tak Road northbound. The road hangs along the steep hillside.

Lam Tin is known as one of the most important transport interchange centres in Hong Kong. It is a frequently visited bus-bus and rail-bus interchange station in East Kowloon.

When the British arrived, most Lam Tin residents travelled on foot or by boat to nearby villages such as Ma Tau Wai. Over the years, the government built roads, tunnels and railways in Lam Tin to facilitate transport between Lam Tin and other districts, making Lam Tin a bridge between different areas of Eastern Hong Kong.

=== Highway and road surface ===
The first road was Lei Yue Mun Road, which succeeded Kwun Tong Road and ran between Kwun Tong and Lei Yue Mun. Cha Kwo Ling Road was later built to tap traffic to Cha Kwo Ling. However, the roads had insufficient capacity to effectively serve the district. Both Lei Yue Mun Road and Kwun Tong Road were widened and became segments of today's Route 7.

The first road that carried commuters into and out of Lam Tin was Kai Tin Road. It was built in the 1960s to facilitate major road transports. The construction of Kai Tin Road required the blasting of Lam Tin Hill, which attracted much attention to nearby residents. Owing to its method of construction, Kai Tin Road became a direct outlet from the hill.

Built together with Kai Tin Road were Ping Tin Street, On Tin Street and Tak Tin Street, which all served Lam Tin Estate. Later Ping Tin and Tak Tin became names of new residential areas after Lam Tin Estate was demolished.

In 1989, Eastern Harbour Crossing was completed. Kwun Tong Bypass was completed in 1991. To construct an interchange for both roads, the intersection between Lei Yue Mun Road and Kai Tin Road was rebuilt into a flyover-roundabout. This made Lam Tin a bridge between the Eastern Harbour Crossing and the Kwun Tong Bypass of Route 2, with Lei Yue Mun Interchange as the exit point.

In 1990, Tseung Kwan O Tunnel was built with its southern entrance in Lam Tin, adding a convenient and direct route to Tseung Kwan O. Junk Bay Chinese Permanent Cemetery was built in the same year. Despite being located in Tseung Kwan O, the cemetery's only motor-enabled exit is located in Lam Tin. As a result, Lam Tin becomes crowded with people tending graves during the various festivals.

The 1990 and 1992 construction of Sceneway Garden and Laguna City, respectively, worsened the traffic congestion in the Lam Tin area, mainly near Sai Tso Wan. One of the new arteries built to relieve the problem is Wai Fat Road, a four-lane dual carriageway which serves as an interchange between Route 2 and Route 7 and an outlet from Kwun Tong Bypass to Kwun Tong Industrial Area.

Pik Wan Road and Lin Tak Road were also built in 1992 to facilitate transport to newly built areas higher up Lam Tin Hill. Because it hangs off a precipice and carries only two-lanes, Lin Tak Road was surrounded by both questions of convenience and concerns about its safety.

As part of the 2001 construction of Ocean Shores in Tseung Kwan O, a segment of the former Po Lam Road South was rebuilt and extended to meet Pik Wan Road near Kwong Tin Estate. The reconstructed road was renamed O King Road and became the first road connection to modern Tiu Keng Leng.

Lam Tin's transport hub status was augmented by the growth of the new town of Tseung Kwan O on the other side of Devil's Peak and Black Hill from Lam Tin in the 2000s and 2010s, and the subsequent construction of the Tseung Kwan O–Lam Tin Tunnel which opened in 2022 and connected to Route 2 at the entrance to the Eastern Harbour Tunnel.

=== MTR ===
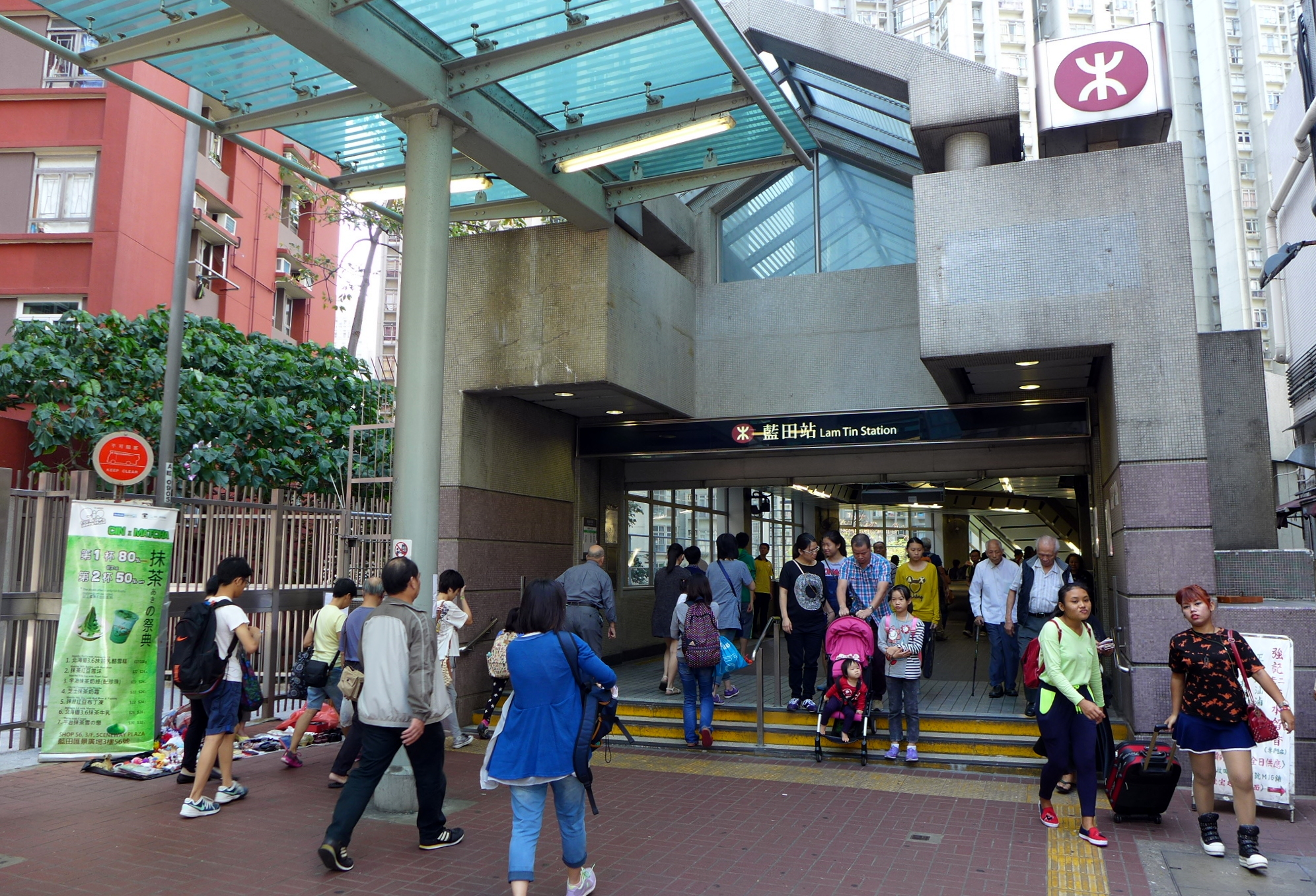
Exit A, Lam Tin station

Between 1979 and 1989, the Kwun Tong line of the MTR terminated at Kwun Tong station. A storage railroad depot that developed behind the station, consisting of three parallel and interchanged tracks, terminating at Kwun Tong Law Court, eventually became part of the passenger railway after the later extension of Kwun Tong line.

In 1984, the government decided to build a second railway tunnel and a second road tunnel to alleviate traffic congestion in the Cross-Harbour Tunnel resulting in Eastern Harbour Crossing, the first railway-road tunnel in Hong Kong. The tunnel enabled Kwun Tong line's extension to Quarry Bay, with an additional stop, Lam Tin, built in the middle. The new MTR station, opened on 8 November 1989, caused an influx of population into Lam Tin.

Built at the same was Lam Tin Bus Terminus, located on the opposite side of Lei Yue Mun Road and housing platforms for franchised buses, minibuses, taxis and cross-border buses. It is also connected to Sceneway Plaza by staircases and escalators. Following the construction of these new facilities, Lam Tin gradually became a major transport interchange in Hong Kong.

As part of the Tseung Kwan O line project, Kwun Tong line was briefly extended to North Point on 27 September 2001 but soon diverted to Tiu Keng Leng when the Tseung Kwan O line opened on 18 August 2002. Now, Lam Tin is on the Kwun Tong line, the third station from the terminus station of Tiu Keng Leng at Rennie's Mill.

=== Franchised buses ===
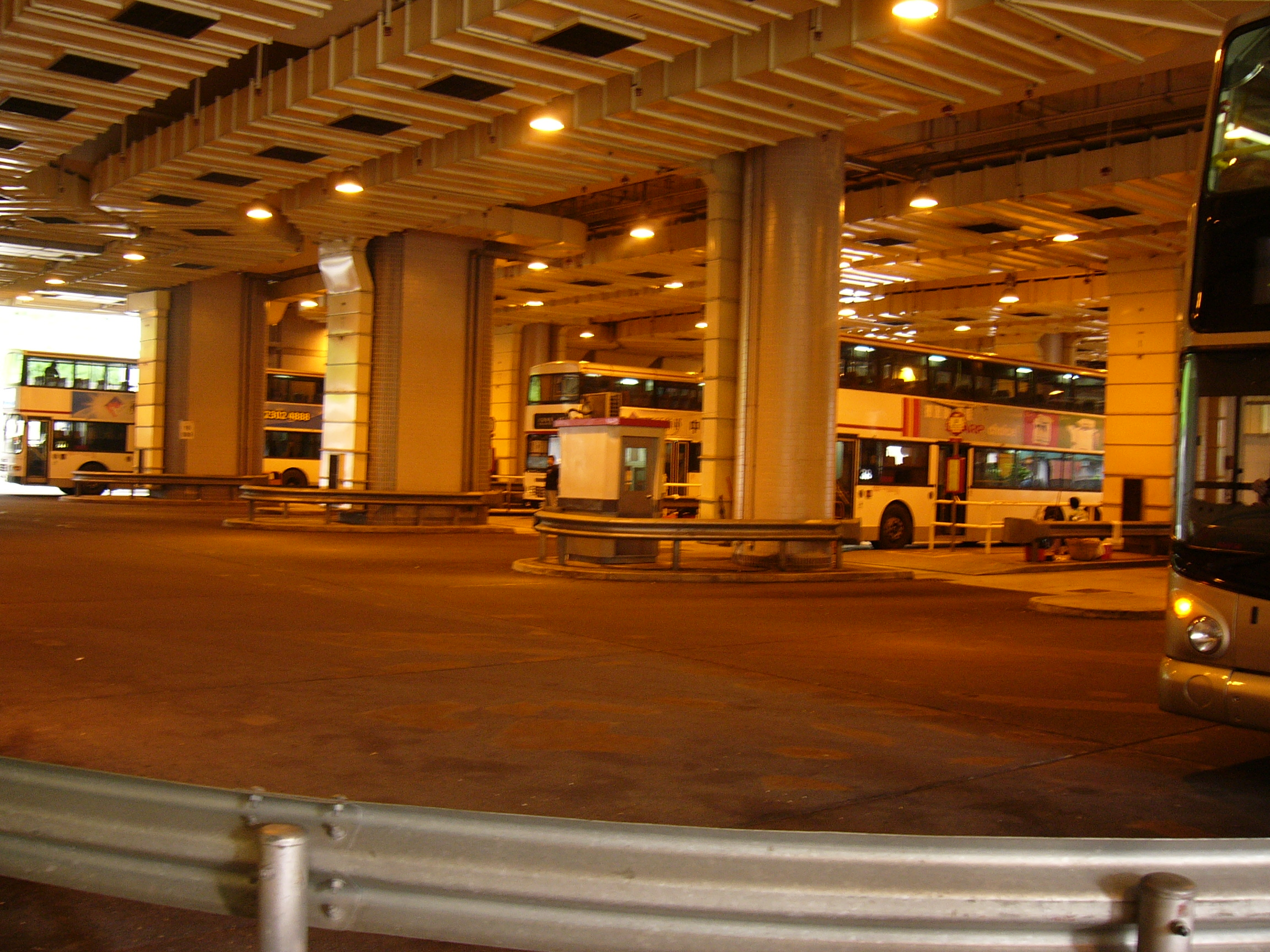
Ping Tin Bus Terminus

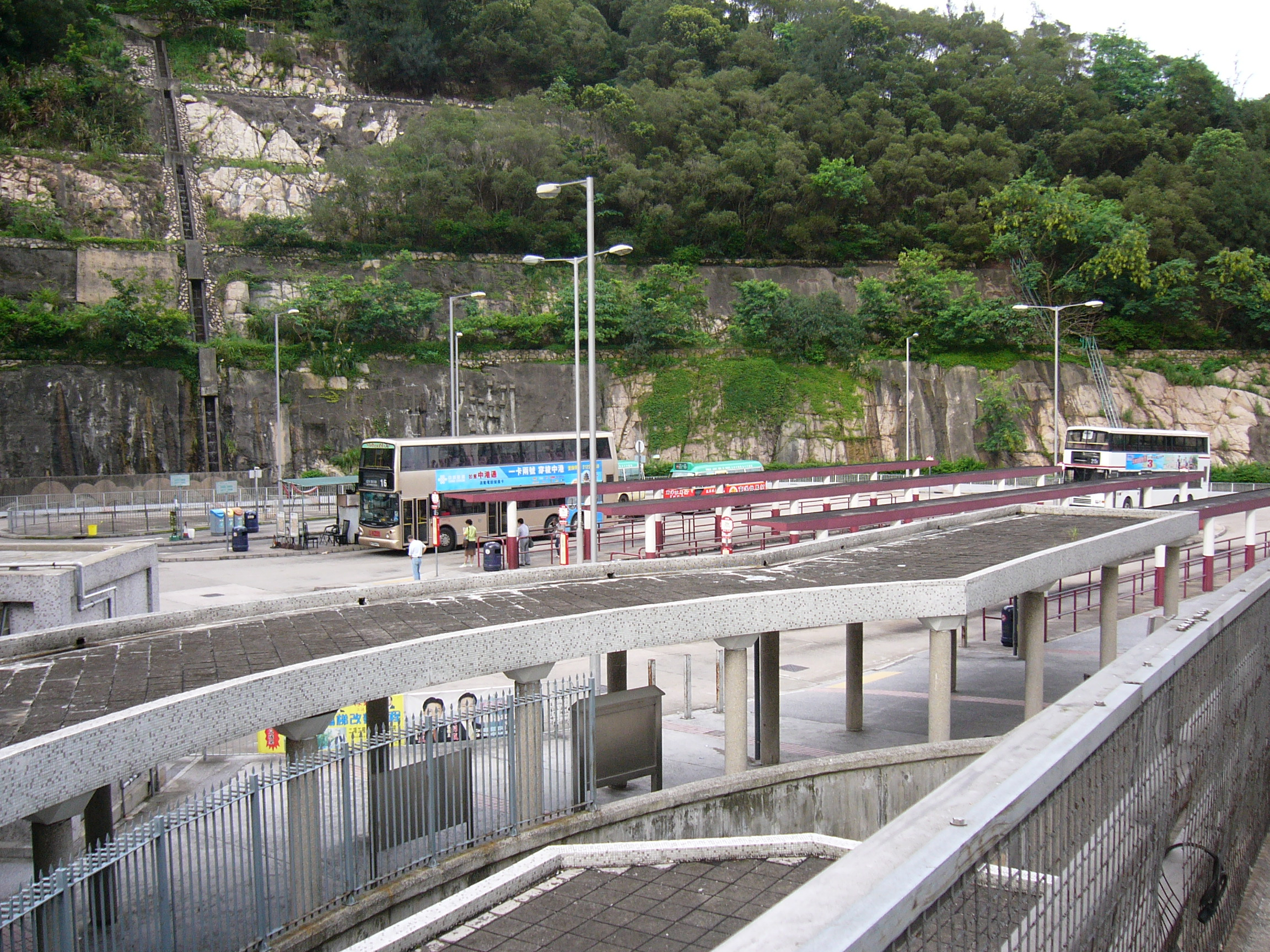
Kwong Tin Estate Bus Terminus

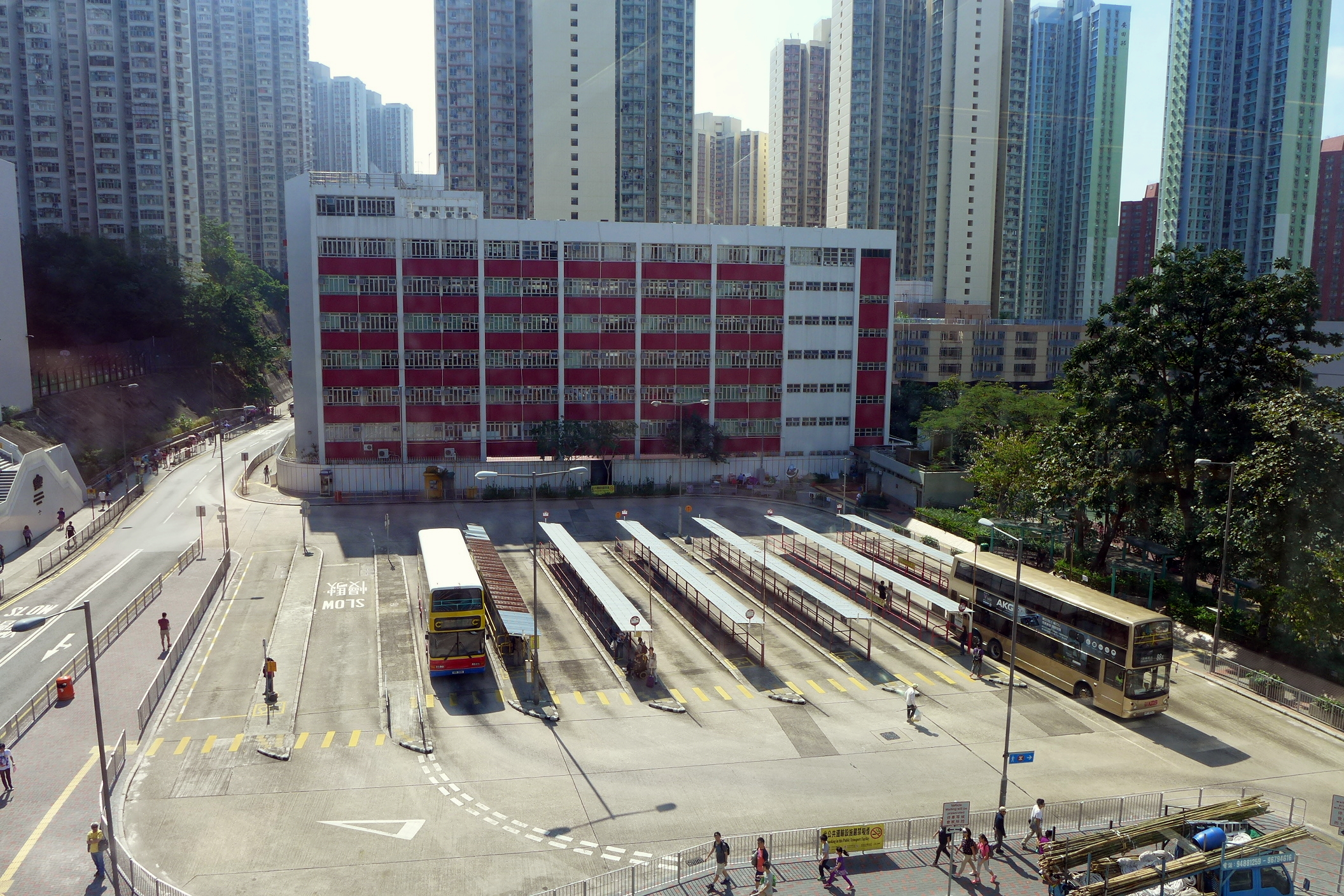
Lam Tin (North) Bus Terminus

The first bus terminus built in Lam Tin was then called Lam Tin Bus Terminus, which is today's Tak Tin Bus Terminus. It is built on the slope of Lam Tin Hill, in the north part of Lam Tin Estate, to serve the neighbourhood's residents. Buses ran from Kwun Tong to the bus terminus through Lei Yue Mun Road, then turned left and ascended the hill along Kai Tin Road, Ping Tin Street, On Tin Street and Tak Tin Street.

Between 1989 and 1994, Lam Tin MTR station, Laguna City and Pik Wan Road were built. To serve these newly populated areas, three new bus termini were constructed: Lam Tin MTR Bus Terminus, now commonly named Lam Tin Bus Terminus as shown on the wall painting of the terminus; Laguna City Bus Terminus, which took up routes originally terminating at Kwun Tong Ferry; and Kwong Tin Bus Terminus, with new routes initiated to serve exclusively Lam Tin and the area nearby.

To disambiguate the names of the termini from one another, the original Lam Tin Bus Terminus was renamed Lam Tin (North) Bus Terminus, and "Lam Tin Bus Terminus" now usually refers to Lam Tin MTR Bus Terminus. After reconstruction of Lam Tin Estate, Lam Tin (North) Bus Terminus was surrounded by Tak Tin Estate. As a result, the terminus got a common name "Tak Tin Bus Terminus".

The area near Ping Tin Street became Ping Tin Estate after the reconstruction. A space underneath the buildings was reserved for a new bus terminus. On 6 July 2003, Ping Tin Bus Terminus was opened and overtook most of the routes from Tak Tin Bus Terminus.

=== Surface transport ===
Surrounded by hills, Lam Tin does not have direct access to the Victoria Harbour. However, merchant ships and ferries dock at Kwun Tong Pier and Lei Yue Mun Pier, which are both within 15 minutes' walk from Lam Tin, and provide surface transport for Lam Tin residents. Another reason for Lam Tin's absence of an outlet to the Harbour is the presence of an Eastern Harbour Crossing entrance inside the district, whose buses and MTR overtook ferries for cross-harbour transport.

== Education ==
Hong Kong Public Libraries maintains the Lam Tin Public Library in the Lam Tin Complex.
