= Devil's Peak, Hong Kong =

Peak in Hong Kong

Coordinates: 22°17′38″N 114°14′38″E

Devil's Peak
- 魔鬼山
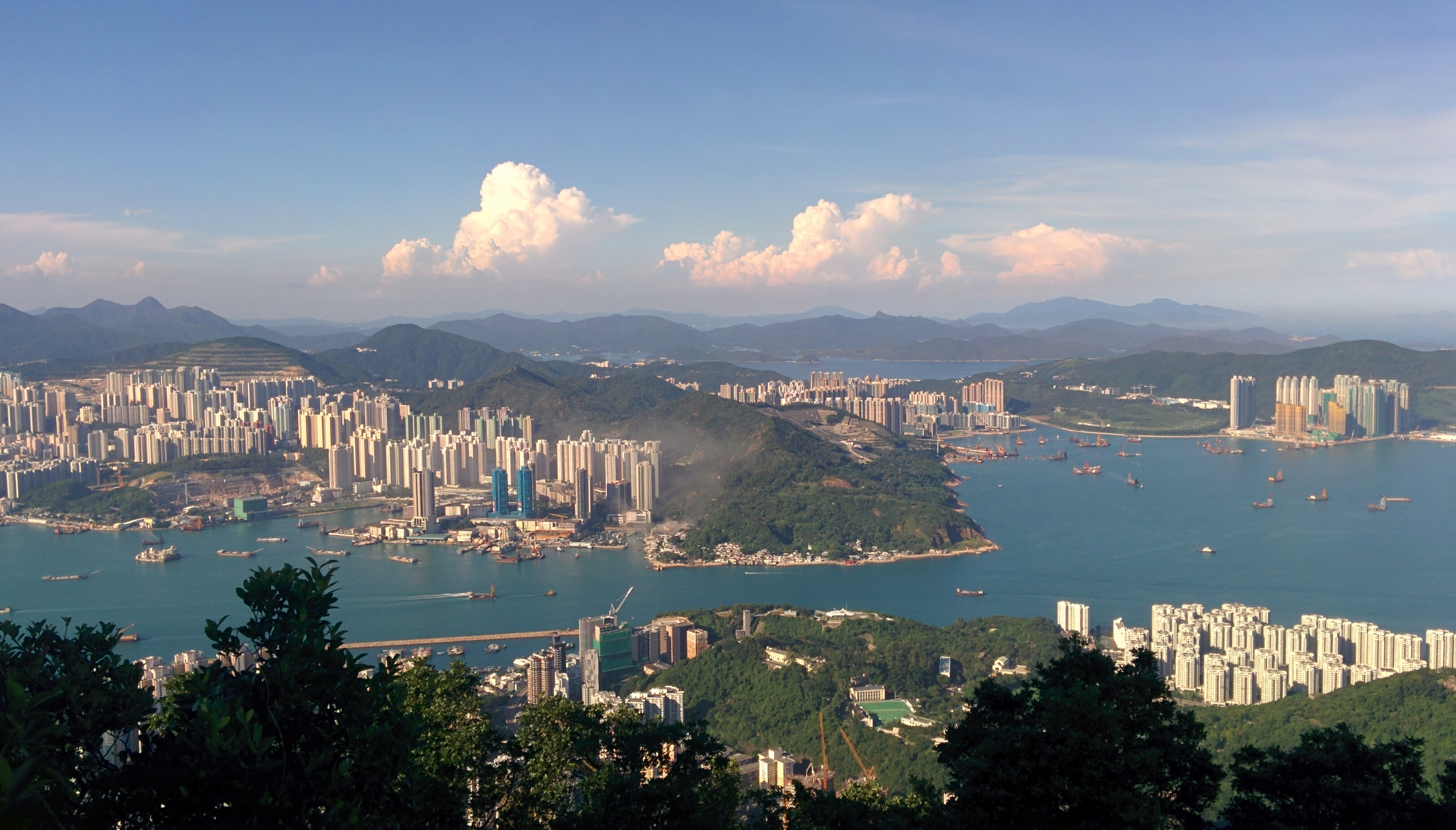
- Devil's Peak viewed from Mount Parker

Highest point
- Elevation: 222 m (728 ft)

Naming
- Native name: 魔鬼山 (Chinese); 炮台山 (Chinese)

Geography
- Location within Hong Kong
- Location: Hong Kong

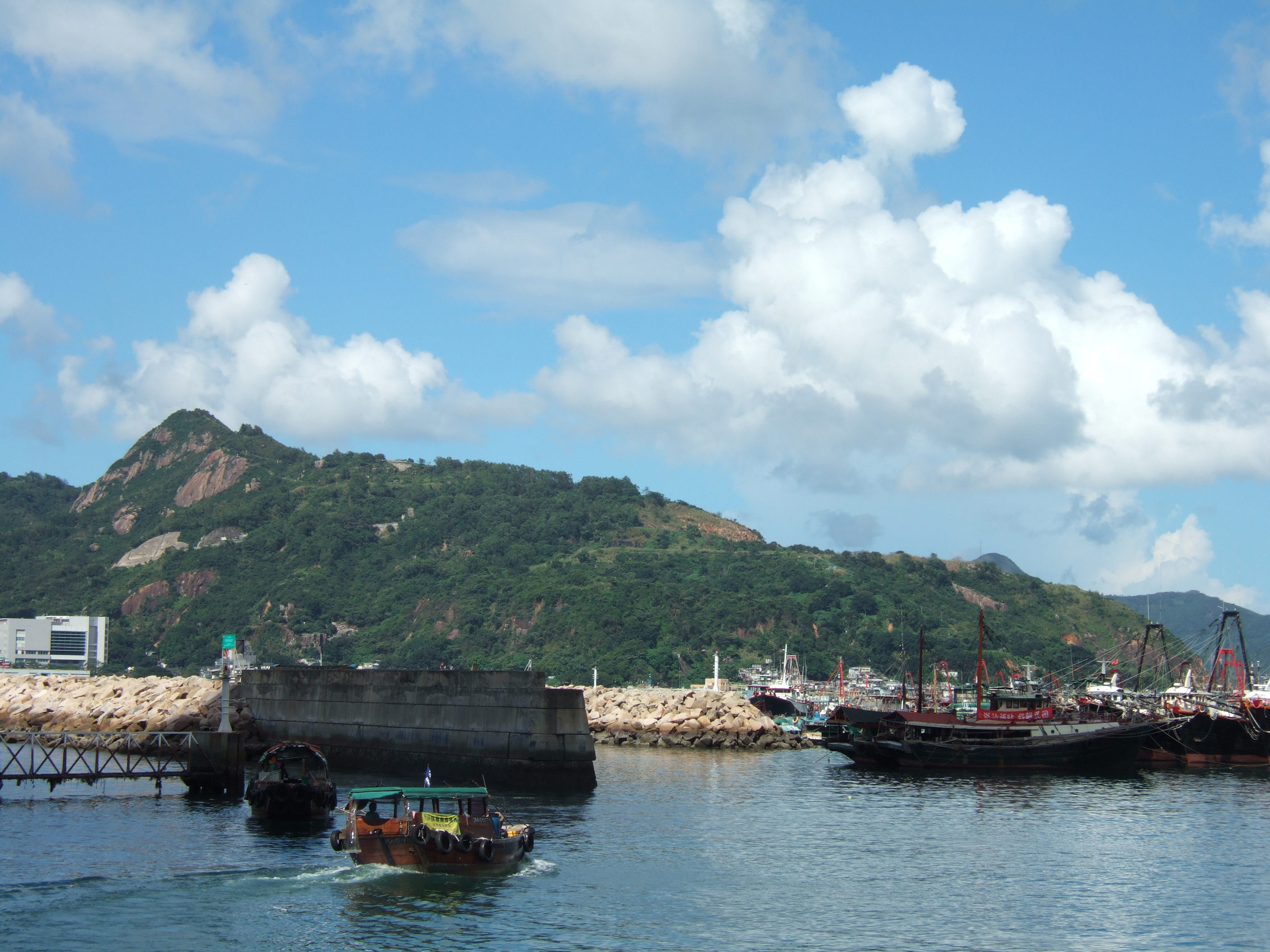
View of Devil's Peak from Shau Kei Wan Typhoon Shelter, across Lei Yue Mun.

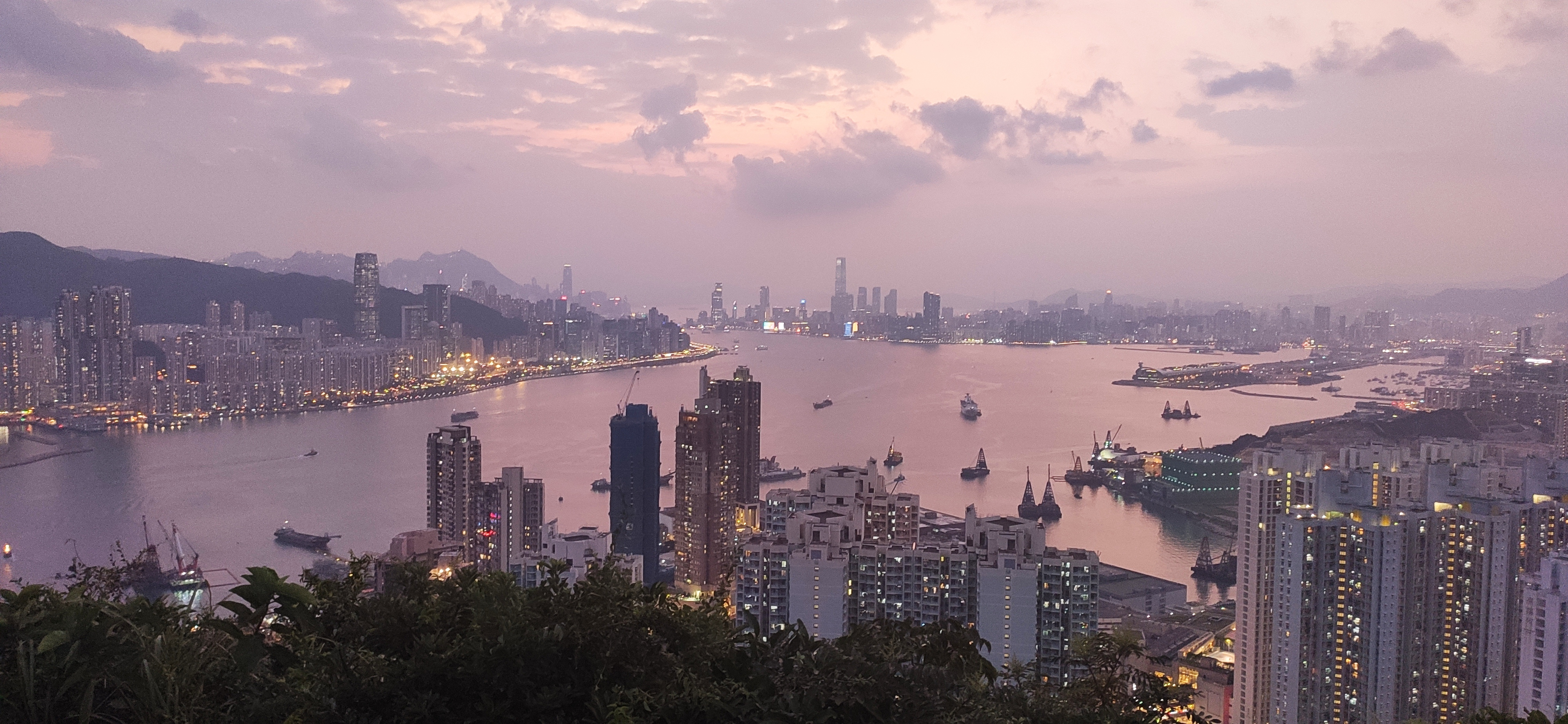
View of Victoria Harbour from Devil's Peak Summit.

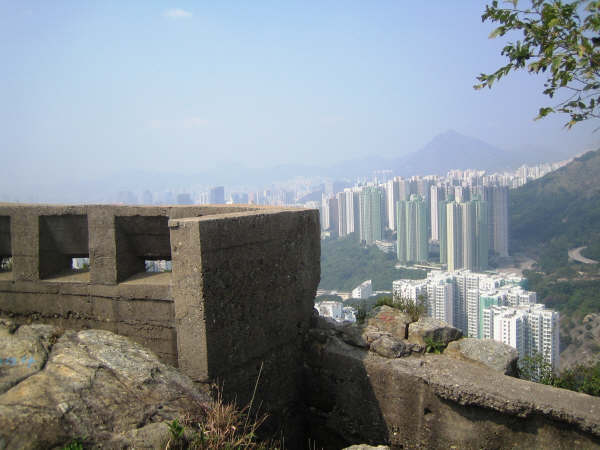
Remains of fortifications on Devil's Peak

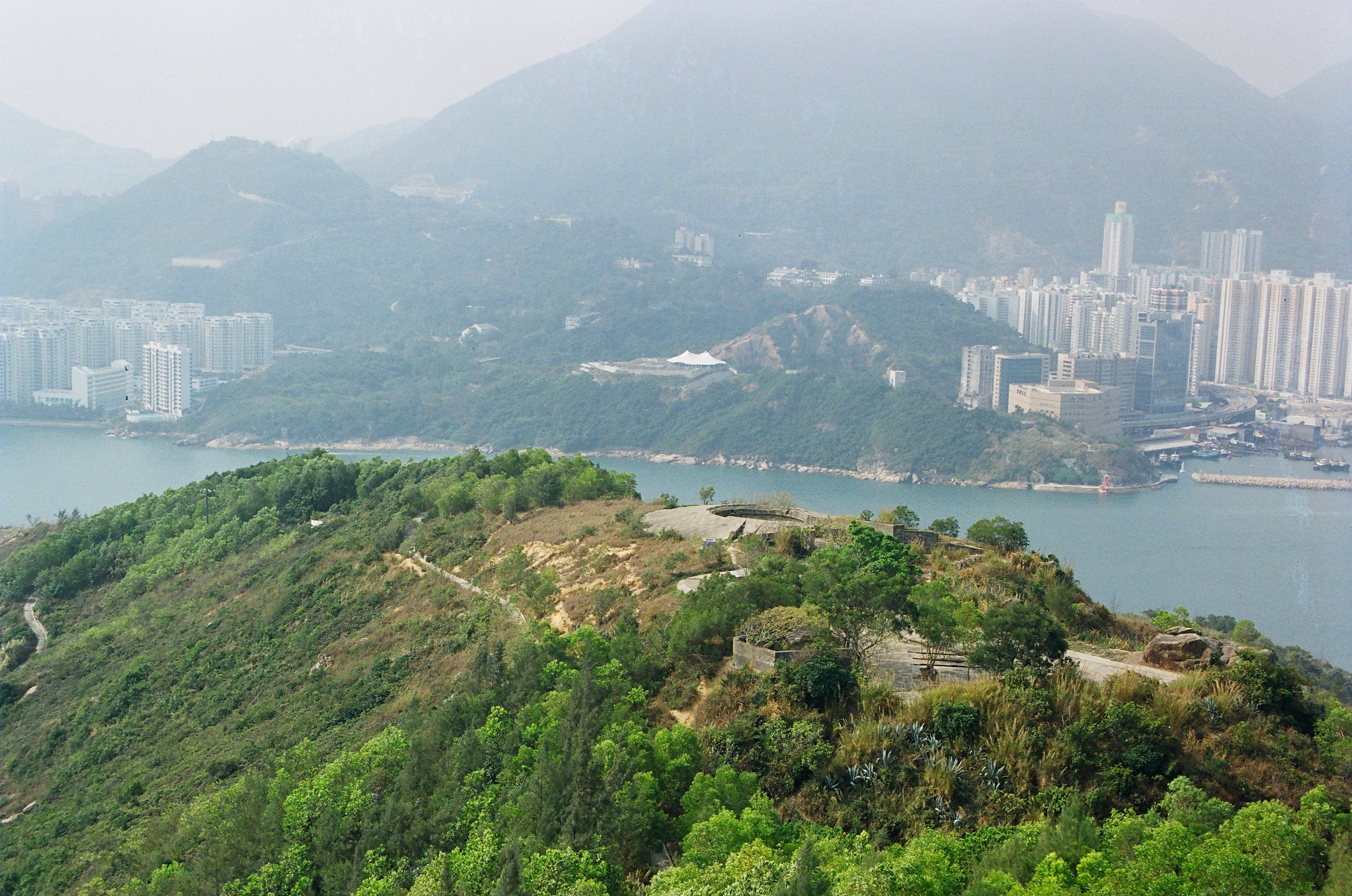
View of Gough Battery, with Lei Yue Mun and Victoria Harbour in the background.

Devil's Peak (Chinese: 魔鬼山 | 炮台山) is a peak in Sai Kung District, Hong Kong. The communities of Tiu Keng Leng, Lei Yue Mun and Yau Tong surround this peak.

It was designated as a Grade II historic building in December 2009 and is currently located on unallocated government land under the jurisdiction of the Lands Department. This military installation is mainly composed of the fortress, Gough Fort and Pottinger Fort, which serve as the east coast design headquarters. Devil's Hill faces the narrow Lei Yue Mun Channel, where you can watch the ships coming from the east of Victoria Harbour. After the British leased the New Territories in 1898, they selected Devil's Hill to build military defense facilities and made it an important military stronghold.

The area around the peak was garrisoned by the British Army in the 20th century and prior to that, by local pirates in the 19th century to control the passage of Lei Yue Mun, an important nautical passage that leads to Victoria Harbour.

== Geography ==
Devil's Peak stands at 222 metres in height. To the east of the peak lies Junk Bay Chinese Permanent Cemetery and Yau Tong lies to its west. The hill extends its ridge south to water in Lei Yue Mun and north to another peak called Chiu Keng Wan Shan.

Section 3 of The Wilson Trail runs through the foot of Devil's Peak and can be reached from Tiu Keng Leng or Yau Tong via cemetery roads.

== Military history ==
The major parts of the military sites on Devil's Peak were built between 1900 and 1914. The remnants of a redoubt and batteries are still visible on the peak. The four main clusters of military structures that remain are:

- Devil's Peak Redoubt, which stands on the summit at a level of 222m. It was built in 1914.
- A small site at 196m
- Gough Battery - upper battery at 160m, was built in 1898 with 2 6-inch guns; one later replaced by 9.2-inch guns; guns removed in 1936 to Stanley Fort; likely named for former Commander-in-Chief of British Forces in China Hugh Gough, 1st Viscount Gough
- Pottinger Battery - lower battery at 81m, with 9.2-inch guns; guns removed in 1936 to Bokhara Battery, Cape D'Aguilar; named for Governor Sir Henry Pottinger

A list of troops whom were stationed here (mainly during World War II):

- 5/7 Rajput Regiment
- 1st Mountain Battery of the Hong Kong Singapore Battalion of the Royal Artillery

== See also ==
- Battle of Hong Kong
- List of mountains, peaks and hills in Hong Kong
- Black Hill, Hong Kong
- Chiu Keng Wan Shan
- Wilson Trail
