= Pak Nga (constituency) =

Constituency in Hong Kong

- Elected constituency for the Kwun Tong District Council
- Boundary of Pak Nga in Kwun Tong District
- District: Kwun Tong
- Legislative Council constituency: Kowloon East
- Population: 13,020 (2019)
- Electorate: 9,423 (2019)

Current constituency
- Created: 2007
- Number of members: One
- Member: Chan Man-kin (Democratic)

Pak Nga (Chinese: 栢雅) is one of the 37 constituencies in the Kwun Tong District of Hong Kong which was created in 2007.

The constituency loosely covers part of Hong Pak Court and Hong Shui Court in Lam Tin with the estimated population of 13,020.

== Councillors represented ==
Election	Member	Party
2007	Francis Tang Chi-ho	Independent democrat
2011	Ho Kai-ming	FTU
2019	Chan Man-kin	Democratic

== Election results ==
=== 2010s ===
Kwun Tong District Council Election, 2019: Pak Nga
Party	Candidate	Votes	%	±%
Democratic	Chan Man-kin	3,825	54.42	
FTU	Jonathan Ho Kai-ming	3,066	43.62	−17.88
Nonpartisan	Chan Yu-ming	138	1.96	−33.34
Majority		759	10.80	
Turnout		7,050	74.82	
Democratic gain from FTU		Swing		

Kwun Tong District Council Election, 2015: Pak Nga
Party	Candidate	Votes	%	±%
FTU	Ho Kai-ming	2,666	61.5	+6.0
Civic	Chan Yu-ming	1,528	35.3	
Independent	Yu Sui-sang	138	3.2	
Majority		1,138	26.2	
FTU hold		Swing		

Kwun Tong District Council Election, 2011: Pak Nga
Party	Candidate	Votes	%	±%
FTU	Ho Kai-ming	2,019	55.5	
Independent	Francis Tang Chi-ho	1,617	44.5	−7.9
Majority		402	11.0	
FTU gain from Independent		Swing		

=== 2000s ===
Kwun Tong District Council Election, 2007: Pak Nga
Party	Candidate	Votes	%	±%
Independent	Francis Tang Chi-ho	1,281	52.4	
Independent	Ho Kam-wing	1,164	47.6	
Majority		117	4.8	
Independent win (new seat)				
