= Chiu Keng Wan Shan =

Hill in Hong Kong

- 照鏡環山
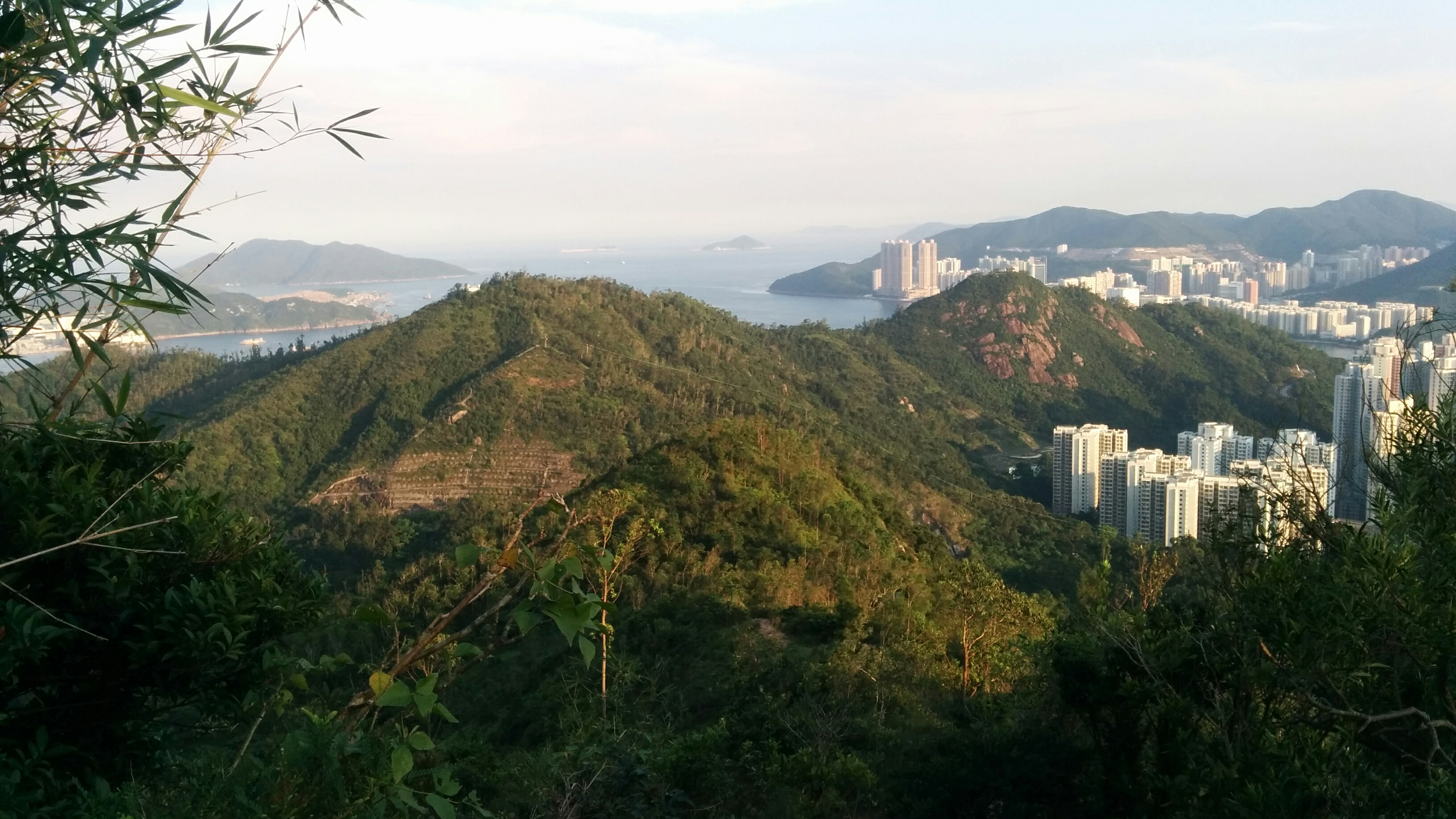
- Chiu Keng Wan Shan (left) and Devil's Peak viewed from Black Hill

Highest point
- Elevation: 247 m (810 ft)
- Coordinates: 22°18′0.17″N 114°14′45.56″E

Geography
- Location within Hong Kong
- Location: Hong Kong

Chiu Keng Wan Shan (Chinese: 照鏡環山) is a hill that lies between the communities of Yau Tong and Tiu Keng Leng, Hong Kong.

== Geography ==
Chiu Keng Wan Shan is 247m in height. To the south lies another hill called Devil's Peak. Junk Bay Chinese Permanent Cemetery is built on the east side of Chiu Keng Wan Shan.

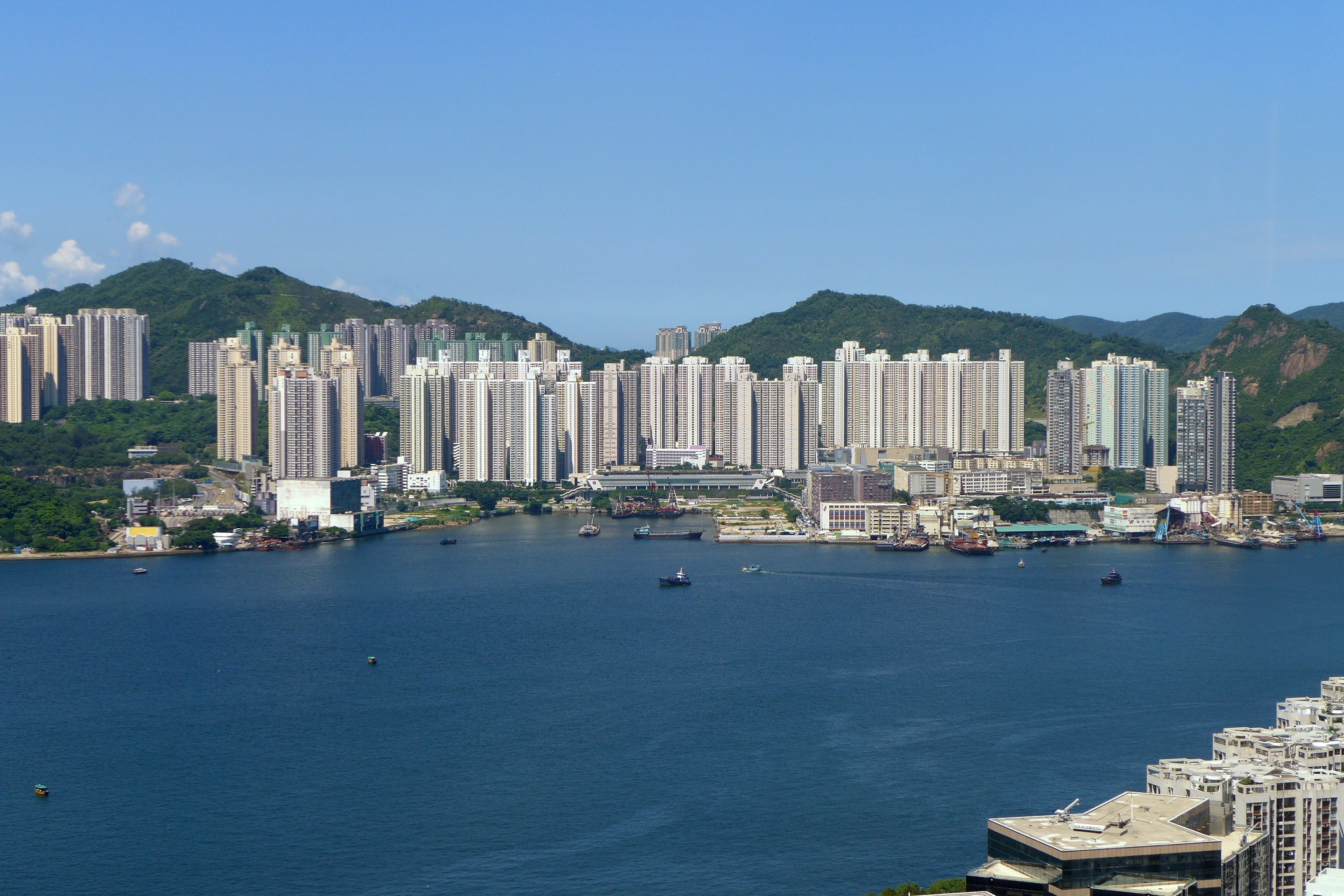
Right of middle lies Chiu Keng Wan Shan. Left of middle are the three main peaks of Black Hill. On the far right, Devil's Peak can be seen.

== Access ==
Parts of Wilson Trail Section 3 is built along the foot of Chiu Keng Wan Shan on the west side. It is possible to access the summit of Chiu Keng Wan Shan after walking up from O King Road, which is a road that runs between Chiu Keng Wan Shan and nearby Black Hill.

== See also ==
- List of mountains, peaks and hills in Hong Kong
- Black Hill, Hong Kong
- Devil's Peak, Hong Kong
- Lam Tin
- Tiu Keng Leng
- Wilson Trail
