= Tseung Kwan O Chinese Permanent Cemetery =

Cemetery in Kowloon, Hong Kong

Coordinates: 22.296336°N 114.247686°E

- Traditional Chinese: 將軍澳華人永遠墳場
- Simplified Chinese: 将军澳华人永远坟场
Transcriptions
Standard Mandarin
- Hanyu Pinyin: Jiāngjūn'ào huárén yǒngyuǎn fén chǎng
Yue: Cantonese
- Jyutping: Zoeng1 gwan1 ou3 waa4 jan4 wing5 jyun5 fan4 coeng4

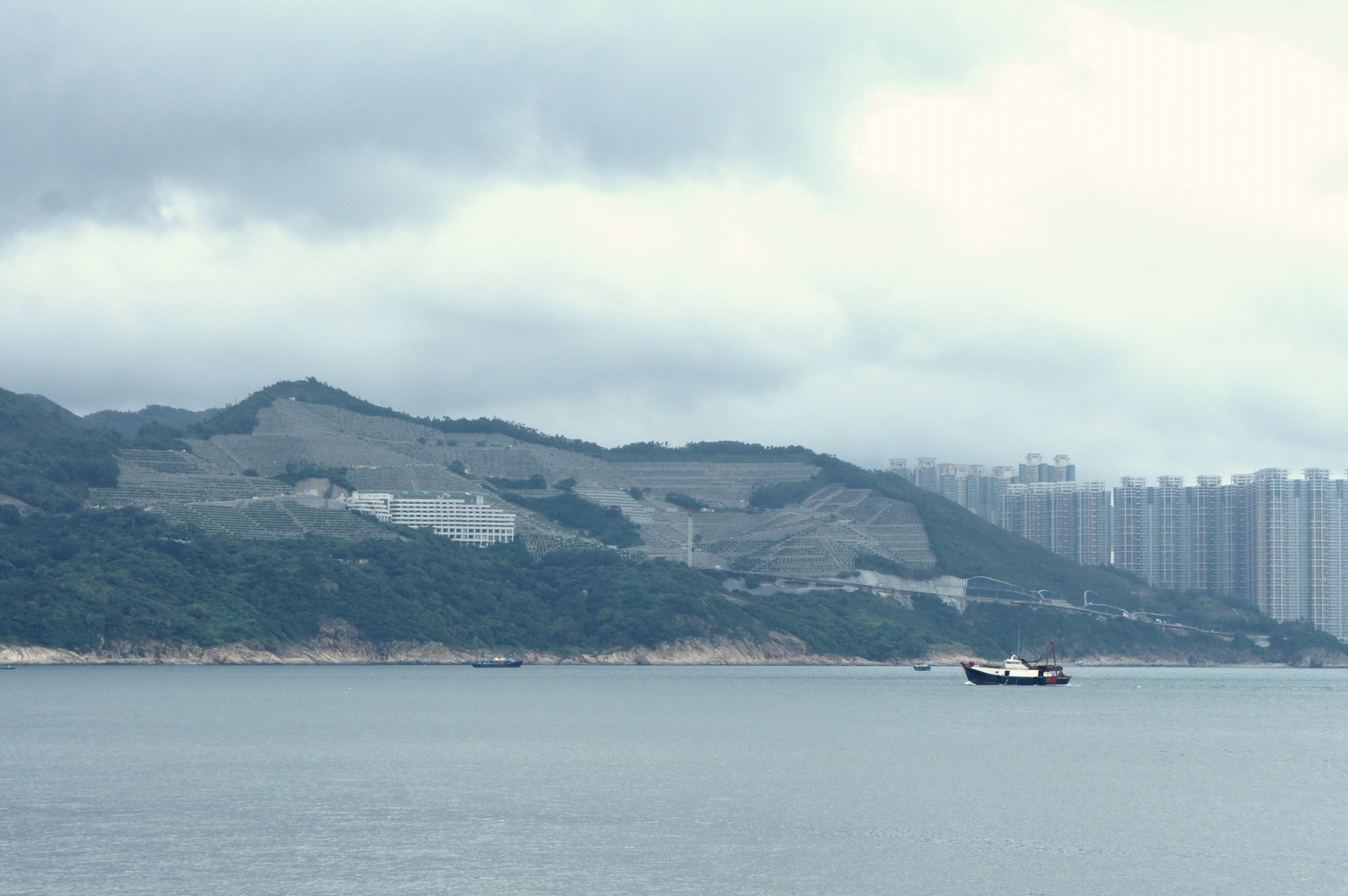
Tseung Kwan O Chinese Permanent Cemetery

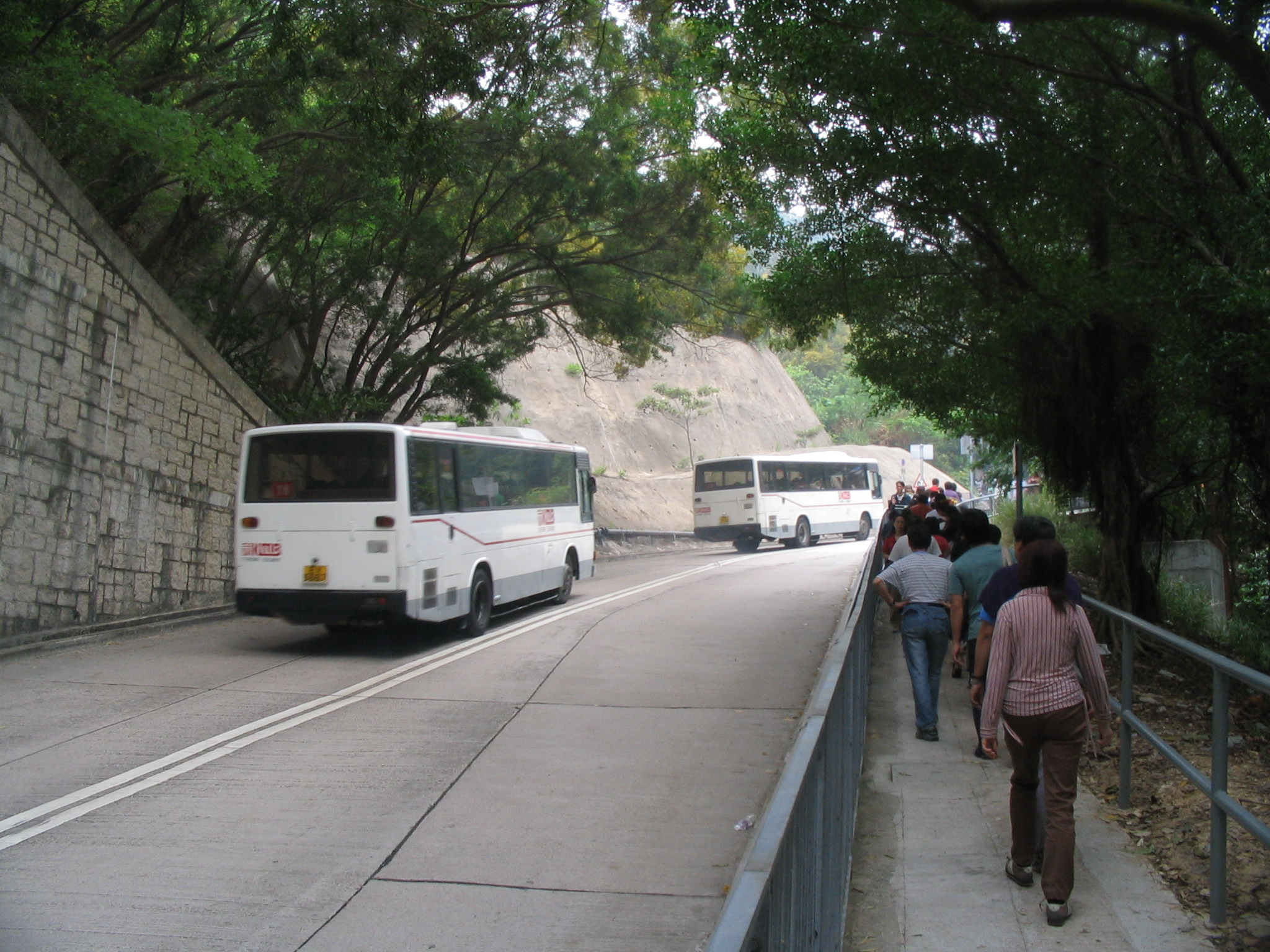
Kowloon Motor Bus circular route 14S links temporarily Yau Tong to Tseung Kwan O Chinese Permanent Cemetery during the Ching Ming and Chung Yeung festivals. The route follows a section of stage 3 of the Wilson Trail, leading to Devil's Peak.

Tseung Kwan O Chinese Permanent Cemetery, also referred to as Junk Bay Chinese Permanent Cemetery is a cemetery in Tiu Keng Leng (Rennie's Mill), Hong Kong. It is managed by The Board of Management of the Chinese Permanent Cemeteries (華人永遠墳場管理委員會). The term 'Permanent' refers to the cemetery site, not the graves.

== Location ==
Tseung Kwan O Chinese Permanent Cemetery lies on the slopes of Chiu Keng Wan Shan (照鏡環山), eastwards of Devil's Peak. It faces the bay of Tseung Kwan O (aka. Junk Bay).

== Notable burials ==
- Danny Chan (1958–1993), pop singer
- Wong Ka Kui (1962–1993), singer and musician
- Sun Ma Sze Tsang (1916–1997), opera singer and actor

== See also ==
- List of cemeteries in Hong Kong
