= Sun Ma Sze Tsang =

Sun Ma Sze Tsang MBE
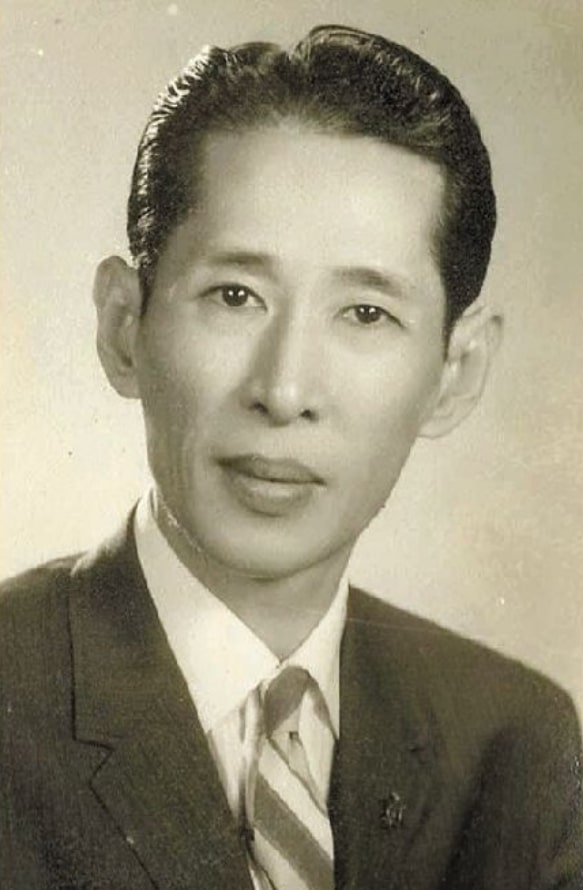
- Sun Ma in the 1960s
- Born: Tang Wing-Cheung; 20 June 1916; Shunde, Guangdong, China
- Died: 20 April 1997 (aged 80); Hong Kong
- Resting place: Tseung Kwan O Chinese Permanent Cemetery
- Occupations: Movie actor; Cantonese opera singer
- Years active: 1920s–1996
- Spouse: Hung Jin Mui (m. 1992–1997) (deceased 2019)
- Children: Johnny Tang (b.1967)

Chinese name
- Traditional Chinese: 新馬師曾
- Simplified Chinese: 新马师曾
Transcriptions
Standard Mandarin
- Hanyu Pinyin: Xīn Mǎ Shī Zēng
Yue: Cantonese
- Jyutping: San^{1} Maa^{5} Si^{1} Zang^{1}
- Musical career
- Genre: Cantonese opera

Tang Wing-Cheung MBE (Chinese: 鄧永祥; 20 June 1916 – 20 April 1997), better known by his stage name Sun Ma Sze Tsang (Chinese: 新馬師曾; lit. 'New Ma Sze-Tsang'), was a Cantonese opera singer and actor in Hong Kong.

== Career ==
Born in Shunde, Guangdong, China, his parents divorced when he was eight. His father, Tang Kei, was a gambling and Cantonese opera addict. He moved to Hong Kong with his mother, Lo Lin, after she had divorced his father. His mother worked as a maid and was often bullied. Tang later left home to learn Cantonese opera.

Sun Ma impressed the Cantonese opera industry by his stunning performance that resembled Ma Sze-Tsang (Chinese: 馬師曾), a famous Cantonese opera singer. His teacher gave him the stagename Sun Ma Sze Tsang, meaning "New Ma Sze-Tsang". Sun Ma became very famous for his singing technique. He later became pupils of Sit Kok-Sin (Chinese: 薛覺先), Kai Chiao-tien (Chinese: 蓋叫天) and other famous Chinese opera singers in Shanghai. From then on his career flourished and he went on to become a film star, while continuing to perform in Cantonese operas. His film debut was in 1936.

Scientists wanted to study his skeleton to understand how people with a small frame like him could hit ultra-high notes. Sun Ma refused when he was alive, and his family never approved of it.

== Charity ==
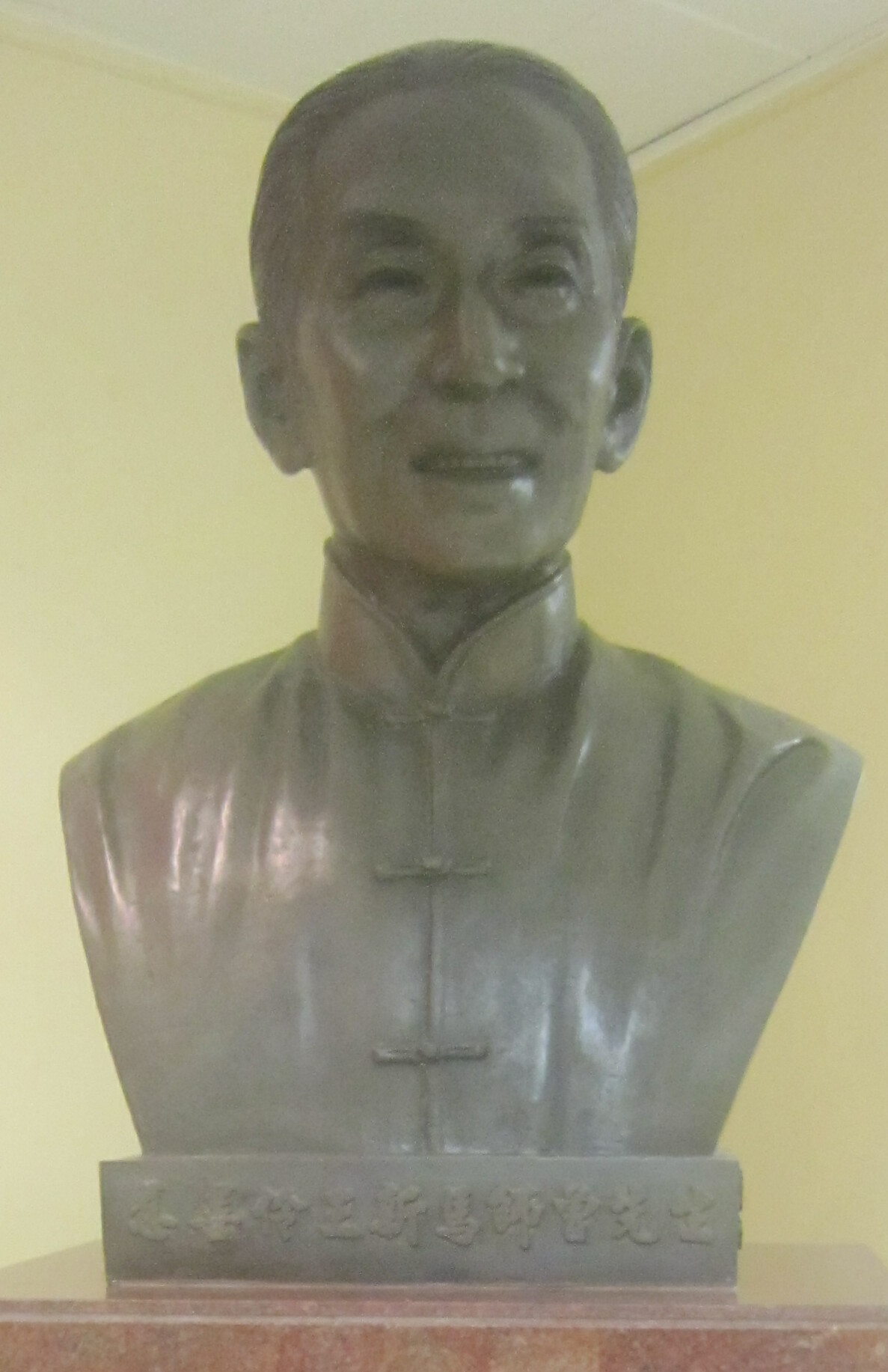
Bust of Sun Ma in Kwong Wah Hospital

Sun Ma was a charitable man who had attended the Tung Wah Charity Show for many years, performing his hits like Man Ok Yan Wai Shou, Emperor Kuang-hsu Mourns Consort Zhen. His performances garnered huge amount of donations and were seen by TVB, the largest Hong Kong TV station, as the most important performance in the Tung Wah Charity Show. He, therefore, gained the nickname of "Opera King of Charity" (慈善伶王) in Hong Kong.

== Honorary professorship and honour ==
Tang was appointed, in 1977, an honorary professor of the University of Cambridge. In 1978, he was made a Member of the Most Excellent Order of the British Empire (MBE).

== Death ==
Sun Ma suffered from bronchitis and heart diseases. There is a rumour that he was the last man in Hong Kong who had a special license to smoke opium. He died in hospital on 20 April 1997 at 8:30 pm after staying in hospital for 109 days. After his death, his sons, including TVB artist Johnny Tang, fought a court battle with their birth mother, Hung Jin-Mui, over their father's assets. Tang was buried at Tseung Kwan O Chinese Permanent Cemetery after a funeral service on 1 May 1997.
