= O King Road =

Road in Hong Kong

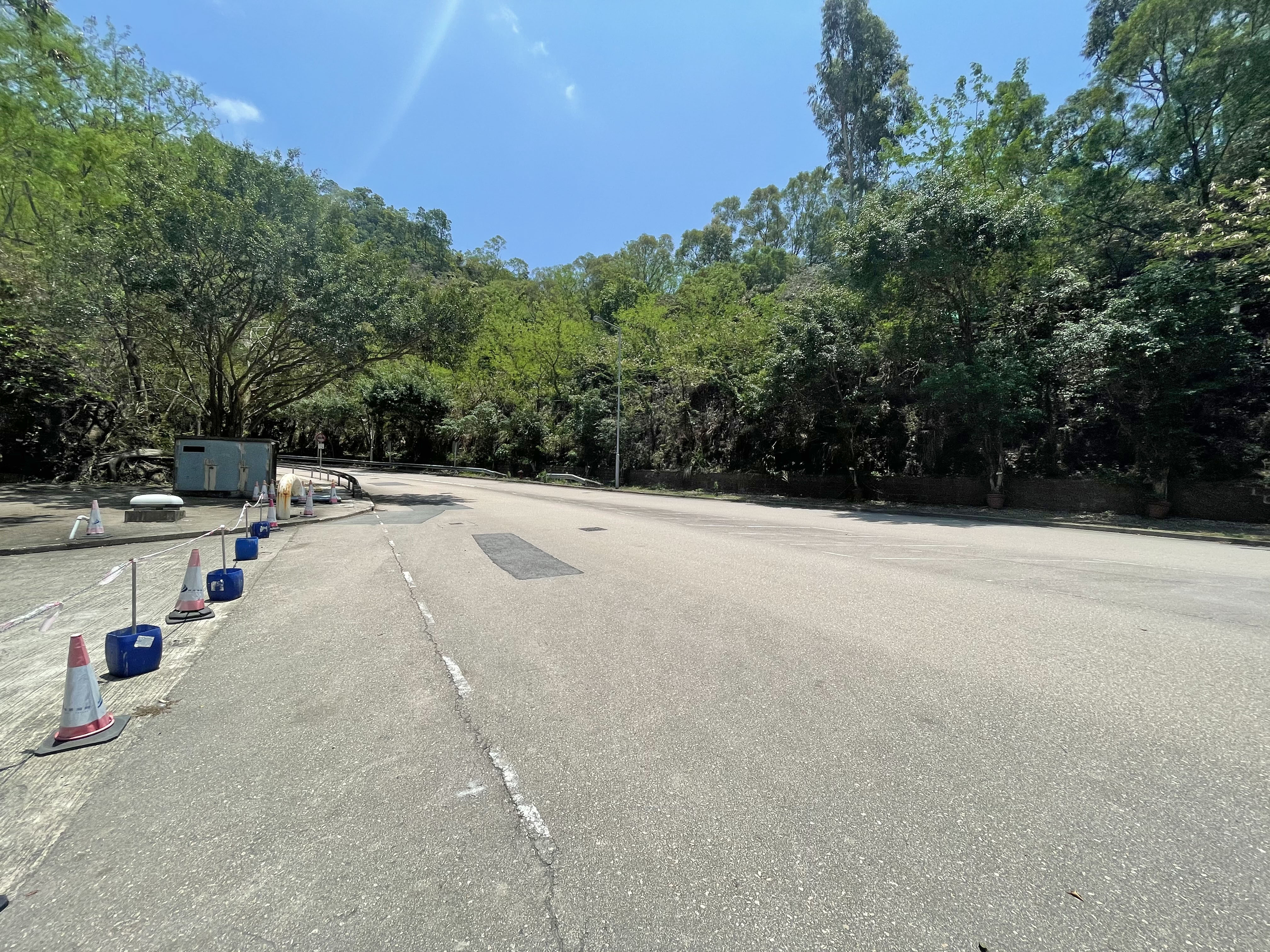
O King Road

O King Road (Chinese: 澳景路) is a road in Hong Kong, to the east of Kowloon. It links Pik Wan Road in Yau Tong, in Eastern Kowloon, with Chui Ling Road in Tiu Keng Leng and on to the new developments of the Tseung Kwan O area.

It was created alongside the 2001 construction of the Ocean Shores residential development in Tseung Kwan O, which lies along its eastern end. A segment of the former Po Lam Road South was rebuilt and extended to near Kwong Tin Estate in Yau Tong. The reconstructed road was renamed O King Road and became the first road connection to modern Tiu Keng Leng.

O King Road rises to 150 metres above sea level, over the hill that separates Kowloon and the Tseung Kwan O area. Since construction of Tseung Kwan O Road, through a tunnel, it is lightly used, with most public transport routes and private vehicles taking that road and the MTR providing direct links to Kowloon and Hong Kong island, though the road remains popular with sports cyclists.

The road is apparently private, although its legal status is somewhat unclear. In 2011, Sai Kung District Office noted that “The land grant provisions of O King Road had not defined clearly whether the road section was a trust territory, a private road or a Crown land. At the same time, consensus was not reached between the Sai Kung District Lands Office, the Police Force and the Transport Department concerning the management responsibility of the road section.”

A short section of the road forms part of the Wilson Trail (Section 3).

Minibus route 108M, between Tiu Keng Leng and Lam Tin used to pass along the road. but this route has now ceased function.

Since December 2018, the connection between O King Road and Tiu Keng Leng waterfront has been cut off. A newly erected iron fence now prevents Ocean Shores non-residents from leaving the road as a residential enabled octopus card is required to function the gate. Guards turn back anyone who is not in possession of the residential card and they are forced to return where they came from.

In order for visitors to drive on this road, residents of Ocean Shores can obtain single-use permits for them which need to be handed over to the guards stationed on both ends of the road.

== See also ==
- List of streets and roads in Hong Kong
- Anderson Road
