= Tiu Keng Leng =

Area of Sai Kung District, Hong Kong

Tiu Keng Leng 調景嶺 Rennie's Mill
- Area
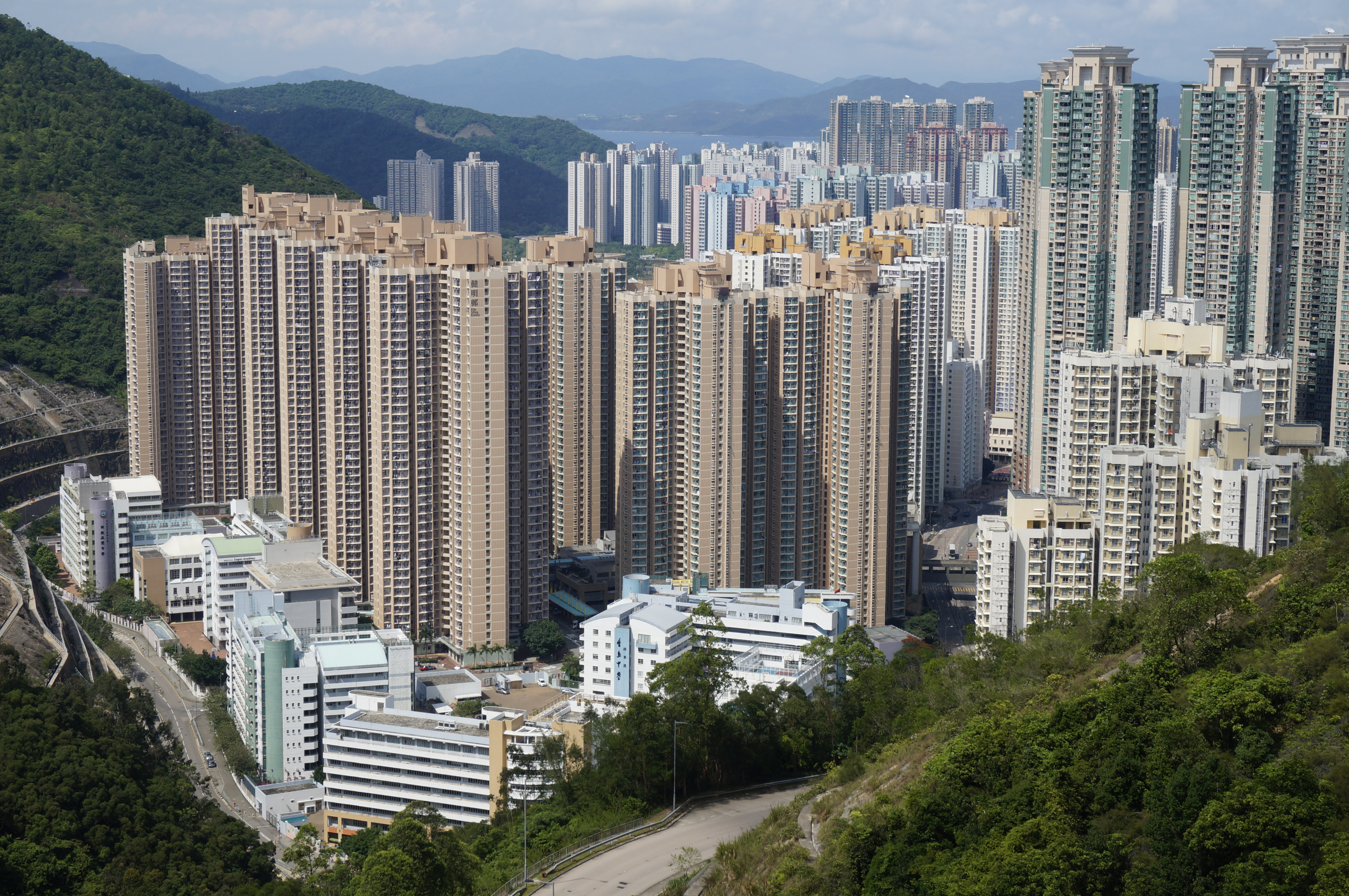
- Tiu Keng Leng was rebuilt and transformed from a squatter area to a high-rise housing estate

- Location in Hong Kong
- Coordinates: 22°18′21″N 114°15′08″E
- Established: 26 June 1950

Tiu Keng Leng
- Traditional Chinese: 調景嶺
- Simplified Chinese: 调景岭
- Cantonese Yale: tìuh gíng léhng
- Jyutping: Tiu4 Ging2 Leng5
Transcriptions
Standard Mandarin
- Hanyu Pinyin: Tiáojǐnglǐng
- Wade–Giles: T'iao^{2}-ching^{3}-ling^{3}
Yue: Cantonese
- Yale Romanization: tìuh gíng léhng
- Jyutping: Tiu4 Ging2 Leng5

Tiu Keng Leng (Chinese: 調景嶺), less commonly known as Rennie's Mill, is an area of Hong Kong in the Sai Kung District adjacent to Junk Bay (Tseung Kwan O).

The area was formerly a refugee village housing former Kuomintang officials, followers, other refugees, and families who escaped to Hong Kong from mainland China after the establishment of the People's Republic of China (PRC); however, the original Tiu Keng Leng village was cleared before Hong Kong's sovereignty transfer to the PRC in 1997, and nowadays Tiu Keng Leng has been thoroughly redeveloped as part of the Tseung Kwan O New Town.

== History ==
The earliest traceable name referring to the area nowadays known as Tiu Keng Leng was "Chiu Keng Leng" (照鏡嶺; lit. 'ridge of mirror reflection'), being a reference to the clearness and calmness of the adjacent bay. The name was given by Tanka residents in the area.

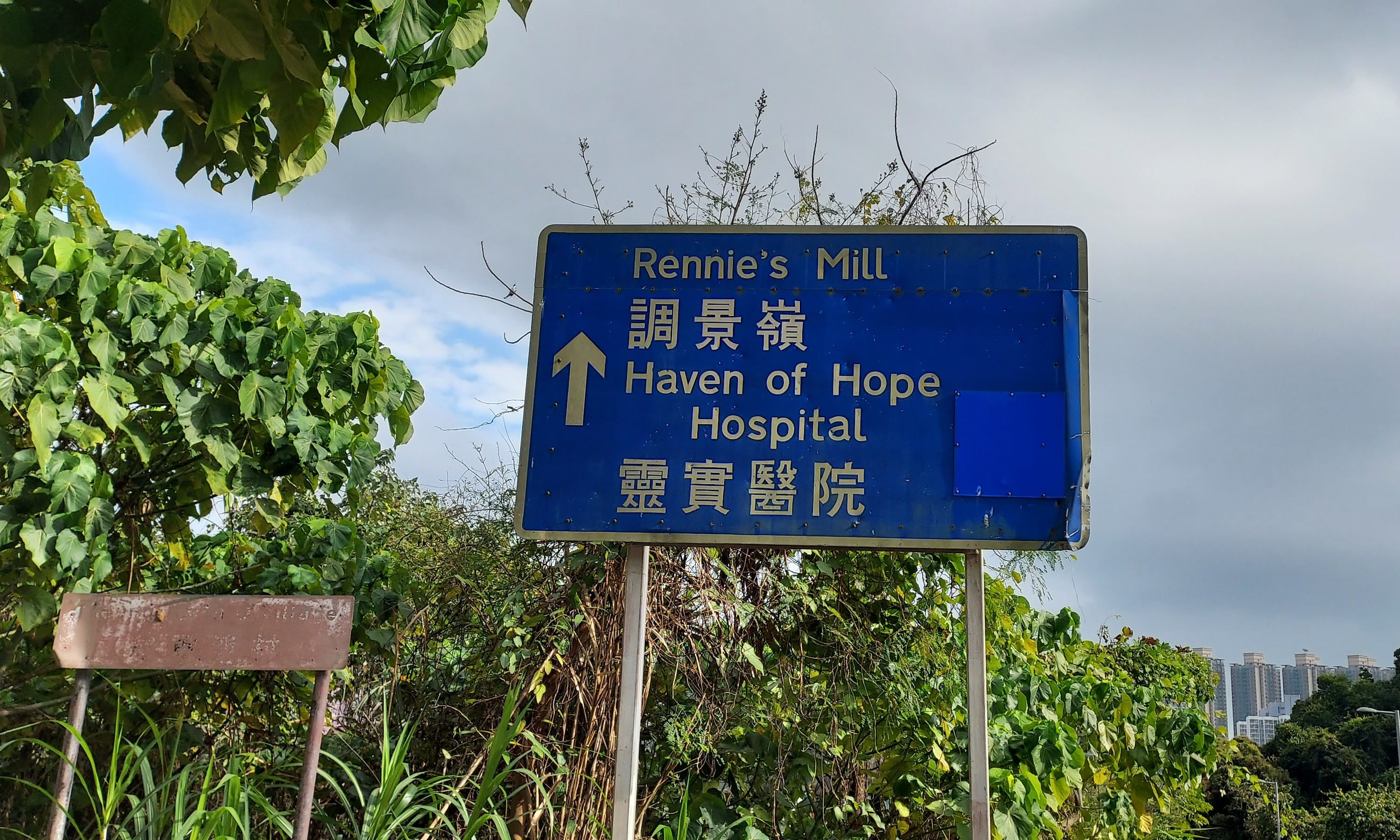
The now uncommon name "Rennie's Mill" can still be seen on a road sign

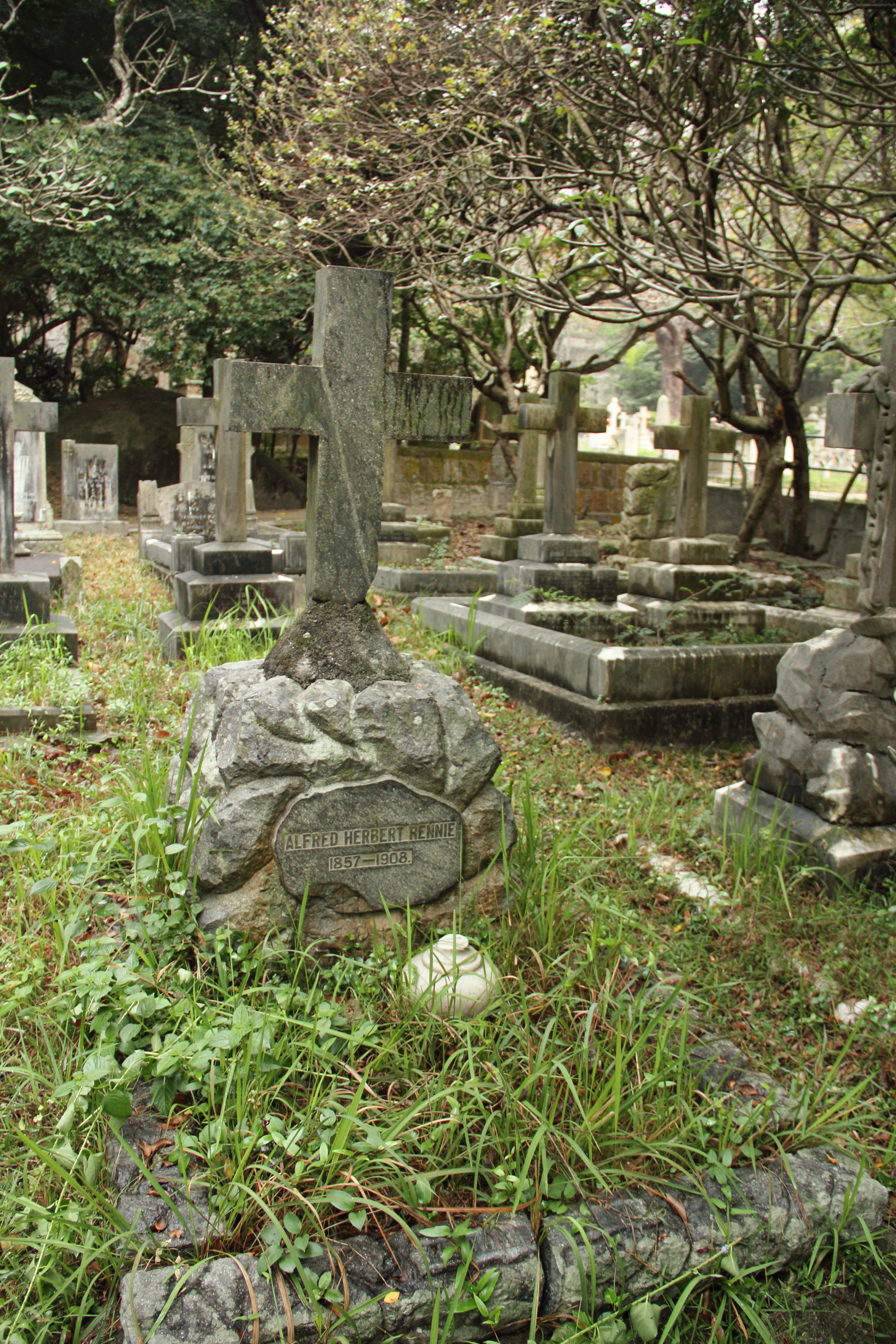
Grave of Alfred Herbert Rennie at Hong Kong Cemetery

Both the names "Tiu Keng Leng" and "Rennie's Mill" come from a 19th-century Canadian businessman named Alfred Herbert Rennie, who established the Hong Kong Milling Company at Junk Bay (his partners were Paul Chater and Hormusjee Naorojee Mody). The business failed, and Rennie drowned himself there in 1908, though it was mistakenly reported that he had hanged himself. The incident gave the Chinese name for the site 吊頸嶺 (Jyutping: diu3 geng2 leng5), meaning "Neck Hanging Ridge", a pun on the name "Chiu Keng Leng" mentioned above. Because it was inauspicious, the name was later changed to similar-sounding 調景嶺 (Jyutping: tiu4 ging2 leng5; lit. 'ridge of adjusting situation')

The 1819 edition of the Gazetteer of Xin'an County does not mention the place.

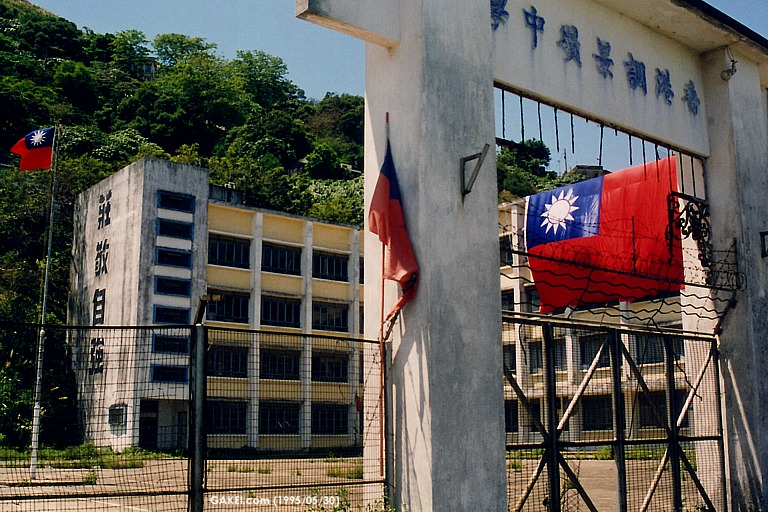
Rennie's Mill Middle School flying the Republic of China flag in 1995 (moved to near Hong Sing Garden and renamed as King Ling College after redevelopment)

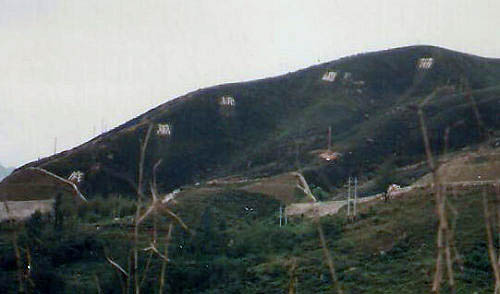
"Long live President Chiang" banner on the hill nearby

On 26 June 1950, the Hong Kong Government's Social Welfare Office (the predecessor of the Social Welfare Department) settled a considerable number of refugees from China – former Nationalist soldiers and other Kuomintang supporters (according to official government account, there were 6,800 of them) – at Rennie's Mill, following the Chinese Civil War. With the newly built temporary settlements, the colonial government provided food and living expenses to the refugees.

The Hong Kong Government's original intention was to settle these refugees temporarily before they would be repatriated to Taiwan by the Kuomintang or to mainland China by the Chinese Communists. However, this day never came for the Kuomintang (under the auspices of a political-oriented charitable body named Free China Relief Association which became prominent after the government suspended food ration in 1953), the residents of the enclave became more supportive to the Kuomintang cause. Thus, by the late-1950s, in correlation with the Cold War context in Asia at the time, Rennie's Mill gradually became a "Bastion Against Communism", with the flag of the Republic of China flying (earning it the sobriquet "Little Taiwan"), its own school system and practically off-limits to the Royal Hong Kong Police Force until 1962 when the Hong Kong Government decided to turn it into a resettlement estate due to its apprehension of the growing Kuomintang presence in the enclave. It also had a significant missionary presence. Owing to its pro-Kuomintang atmosphere, the 1967 riots did not have an effect on Rennie's Mill.

Rennie's Mill was badly damaged by Typhoon Wanda in 1962, rendering many homeless.

In 1996 the Hong Kong government evicted the last of Rennie's Mill's original residents, ostensibly to make room for new town developments as part of the Tseung Kwan O New Town, but widely believed to be a move to please the Communist Chinese government before the transfer of sovereignty over Hong Kong in 1997.

Earlier in 1961, the people of Rennie's Mill were promised by the government that they would be able to stay "indefinitely," and in June 1996, residents petitioned the High Court, where judge Raymond Sears found that "In my judgment, the conduct of the Housing Authority by serving notices to quit, in breach of the clear promises of 1961, amounts to an abuse of power."

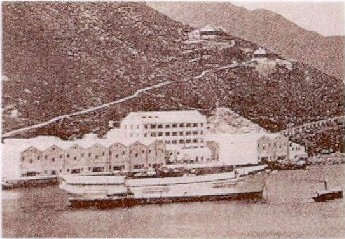
Hong Kong Milling Company in 1910s

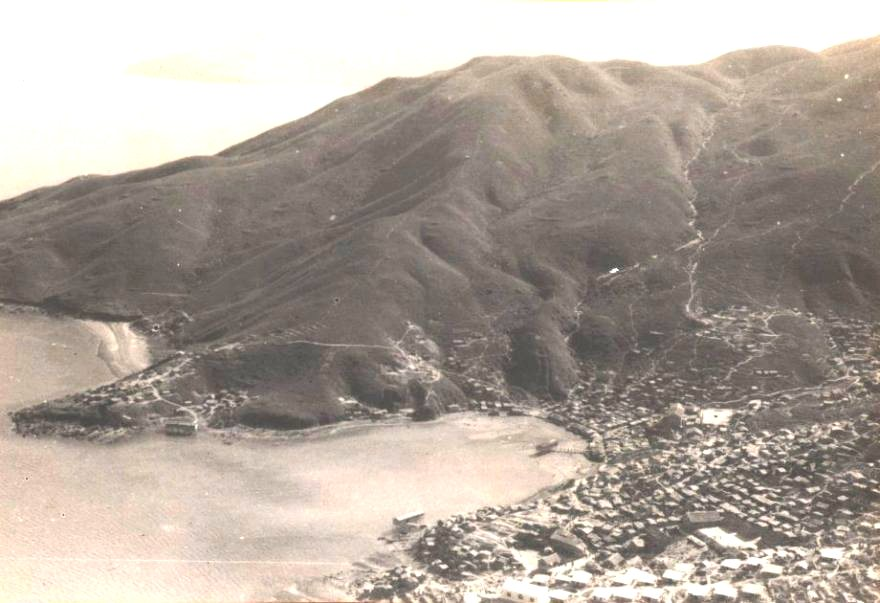
Rennie's Mill in 1950s

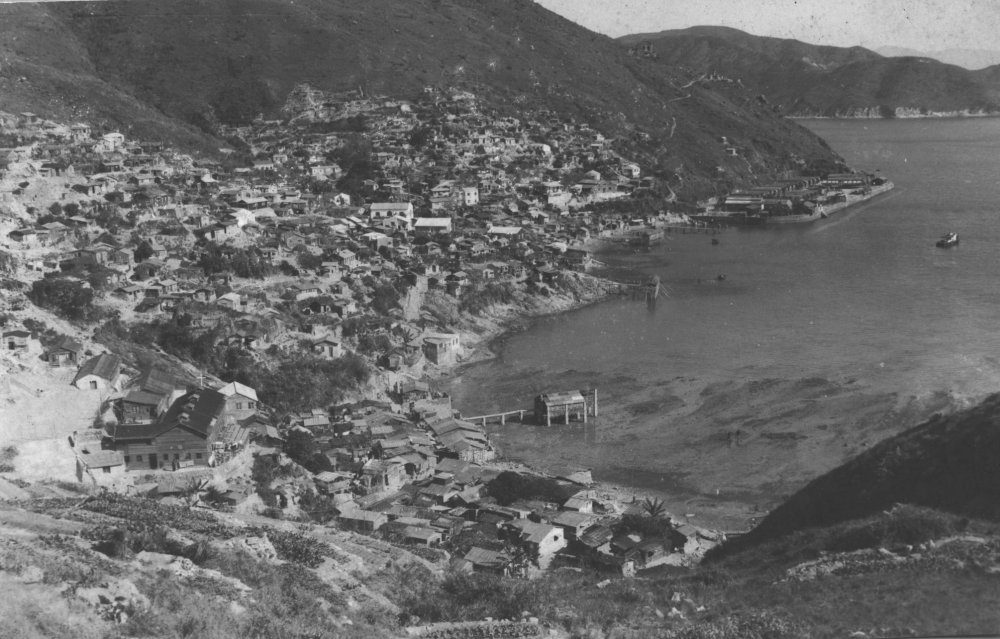
Rennie's Mill in 1955

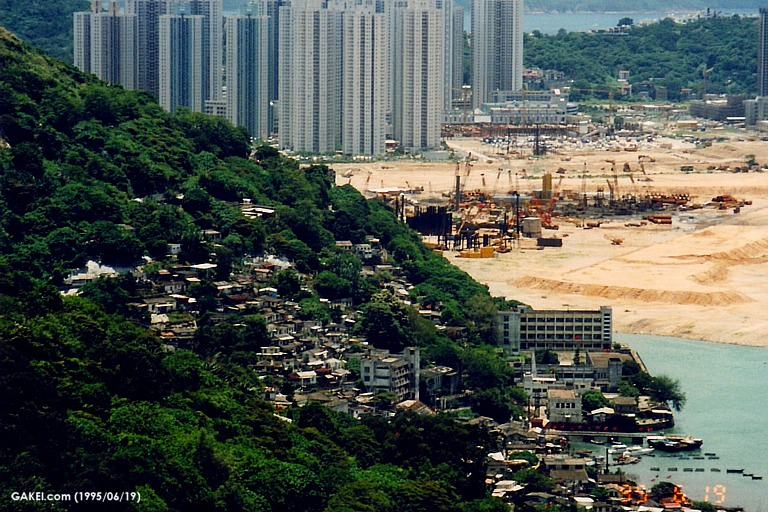
Rennie's Mill in 1995

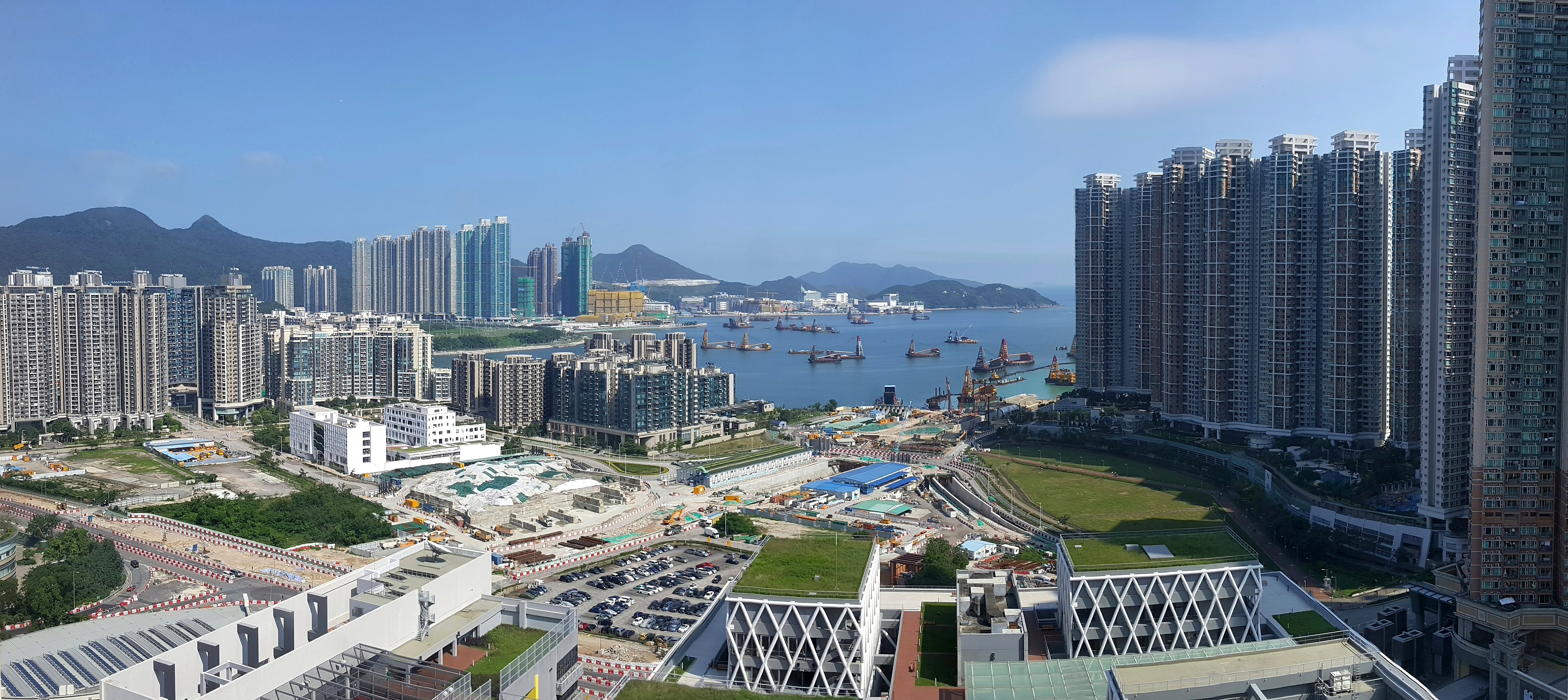
Tiu Keng Leng and Tseung Kwan O South in 2019

== Housing ==
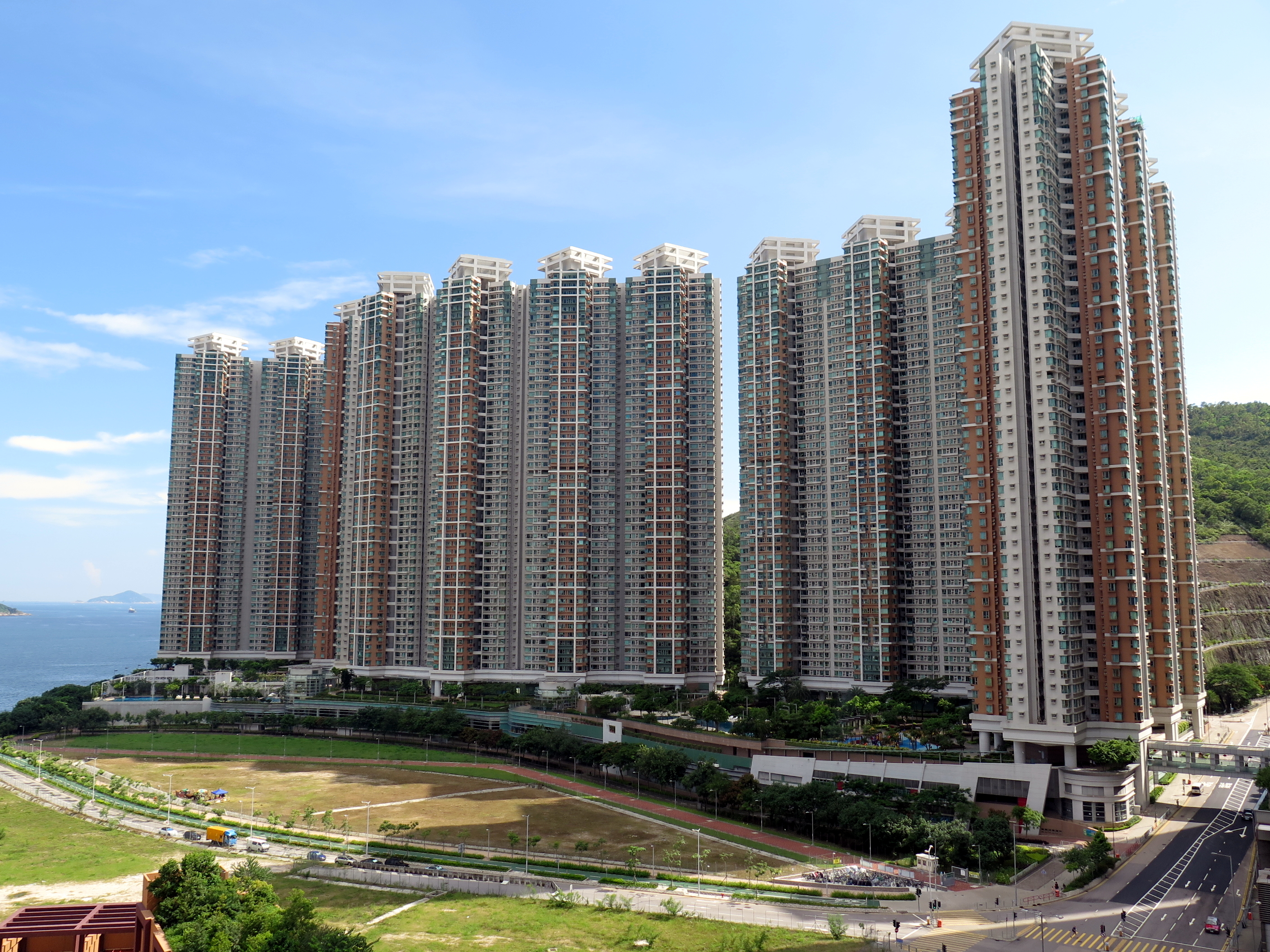
Ocean Shores

After the handover, the English name of the area was changed from "Rennie's Mill" to "Tiu Keng Leng", following the Cantonese name. Tiu Keng Leng became redeveloped as a modern high-rise residential district.

Metro Town is a private housing estate situated directly above the Tiu Keng Leng Station. With nine towers built on top of a carpark/shopping mall podium, it is the tallest structure in the area.

To the south of Metro Town, on the site of a former steel mill operated by Shiu Wing Steel, is another private housing estate, Ocean Shores.

The three public housing estates in the area are Kin Ming Estate, Choi Ming Court and Shin Ming Estate.

== Transport ==
Before the redevelopment and reclamation in the surrounding area, Tiu Keng Leng could be reached by the winding, hilly and narrow Po Lam Road South, which ran past numerous busy quarries. At that time, Tiu Keng Leng's only public transport connections were Kowloon Motor Bus routes 90 and 290, served with minibuses, and by water transport. In 2001, with the redevelopment, a segment of Po Lam Road South was rebuilt and extended to near Kwong Tin Estate in Yau Tong. The reconstructed road was renamed O King Road and became the first road connection to modern Tiu Keng Leng. Tseung Kwan O-Lam Tin Tunnel, opened in 2022, provides a direct and fast route into Kowloon and the city centre.

The various centres of Tseung Kwan O were always intended to be served primarily by the MTR metro system, and the 2002 opening of Tiu Keng Leng station of the Tseung Kwan O line and Kwun Tong line provided a much-used link to the urban area of Kowloon.

== Education ==
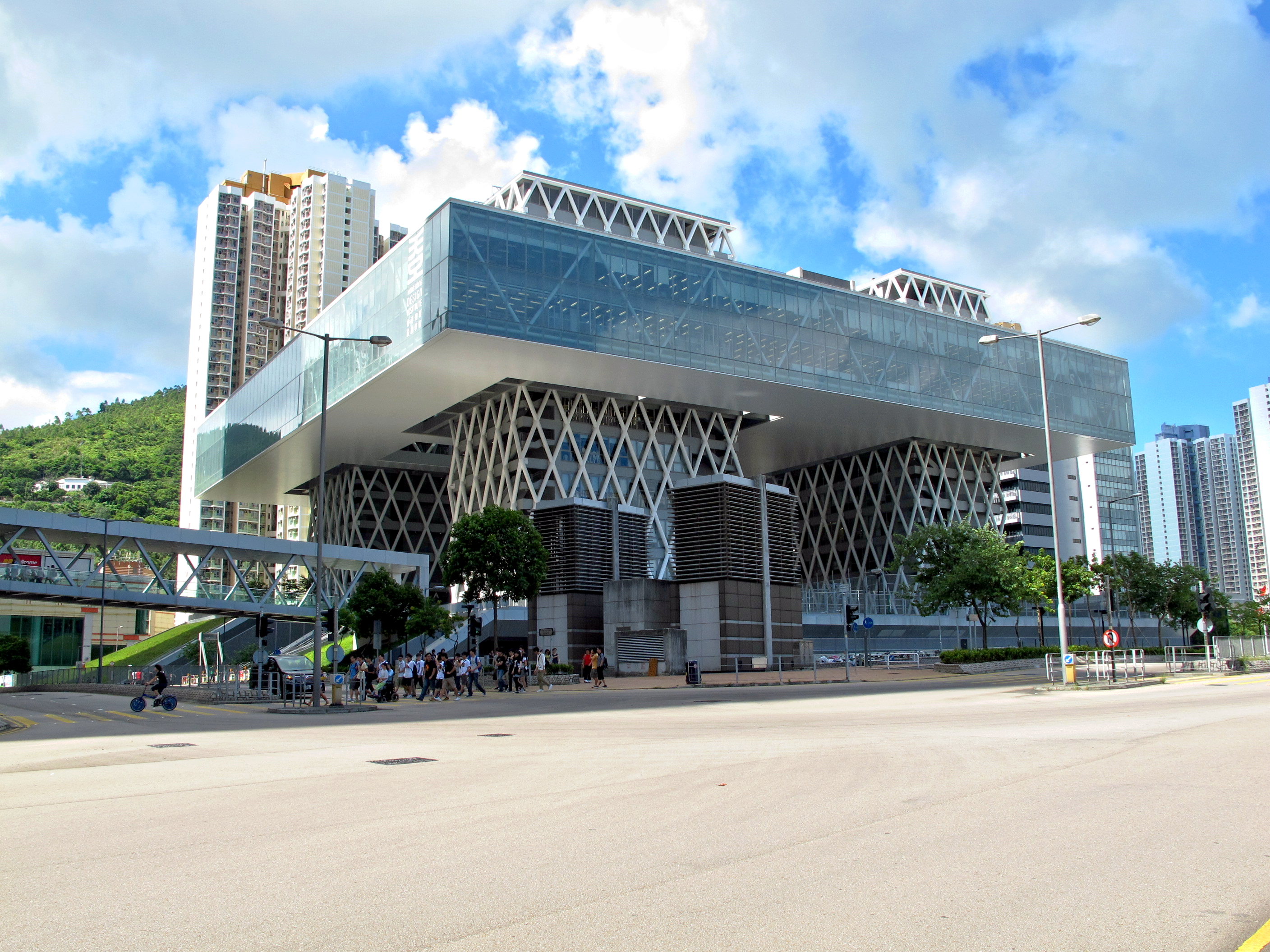
Hong Kong Design Institute

The Hong Kong Design Institute (HKDI) is well known for the shape of its building. Designed by French architects Coldefy & Associs, it resembles a piece of paper floating mid-air featuring a glazed box raised seven storeys above the ground on four lattice-steel towers that rest on a sloping, grass-covered podium. Total construction cost amounted to HK$1.2 billion, it was opened in November 2010.

The Hong Kong Institute of Vocational Education (IVE) – Lee Wai Lee campus is located next to HKDI. Also, the campus of Saint Francis University is located at Tiu Keng Leng. It is the first Catholic University in Hong Kong.

Hong Kong Public Libraries operates the Tiu Keng Leng Public Library.

== See also ==
- Military dependents' village
