= Public housing estates in Lam Tin =

Public housing in Lam Tin, Hong Kong

The following shows an overview of public housing estates, including those of the Home Ownership Scheme (HOS), Private Sector Participation Scheme (PSPS), and Tenant Purchase Scheme (TPS), in Lam Tin of Kwun Tong District, Kowloon, Hong Kong.

== History ==
Lam Tin is the hill area at the southeast of Kwun Tong District. There was a resettlement estate in the area called the Lam Tin Resettlement Estate (Chinese: 藍田徙置區) in the 1960s.

The resettlement had in total 23 blocks. Block 15 was also the 500th public estate building constructed by the Works Bureau. All blocks in the estate were demolished as part of the Lam Tin Estate Redevelopment Project (Chinese: 藍田邨重建計劃) between the 1980s and 2000s, which they were replaced by new blocks of Kai Tin Estate (Chinese: 啟田邨), Ping Tin Estate (Chinese: 平田邨), On Tin Estate (Chinese: 安田邨) and the new Lam Tin Estate (Chinese: 藍田邨).

== Overview ==
English Name	Chinese Name	Housing Type	Year of Inauguration	No. of Blocks	No. of Units	Notes
Hing Tin Estate	興田邨	TPS	1987	3	635	
Hong Nga Court	康雅苑	HOS	1993	3	1,824	
Hong Pak Court	康栢苑	HOS	1993	7	2,410	
Hong Shui Court	康瑞苑	HOS	1999	1	350	
Hong Tin Court	康田苑	HOS	1982	3	792	
Hong Wah Court	康華苑	HOS	1987	3	1,680	
Hong Yat Court	康逸苑	HOS	2001	5	1,600	
Hong Ying Court	康盈苑	HOS	1991	1	816	
Kai Tin Estate	啟田邨	Public	1997	3	2,355	
Kwong Tin Estate	廣田邨	Public	1992	4	2,453	
Lei On Court	鯉安苑	HOS	2002	6	1,684	
On Tin Estate	安田邨	Public	2005	2	720	
Ping Tin Estate	平田邨	Public	1997	8	5,721	
Tak Tin Estate	德田邨	TPS	1991	9	294	
Lam Tin Estate	藍田邨	Public	2009	4	3,000	

== Hing Tin Estate ==
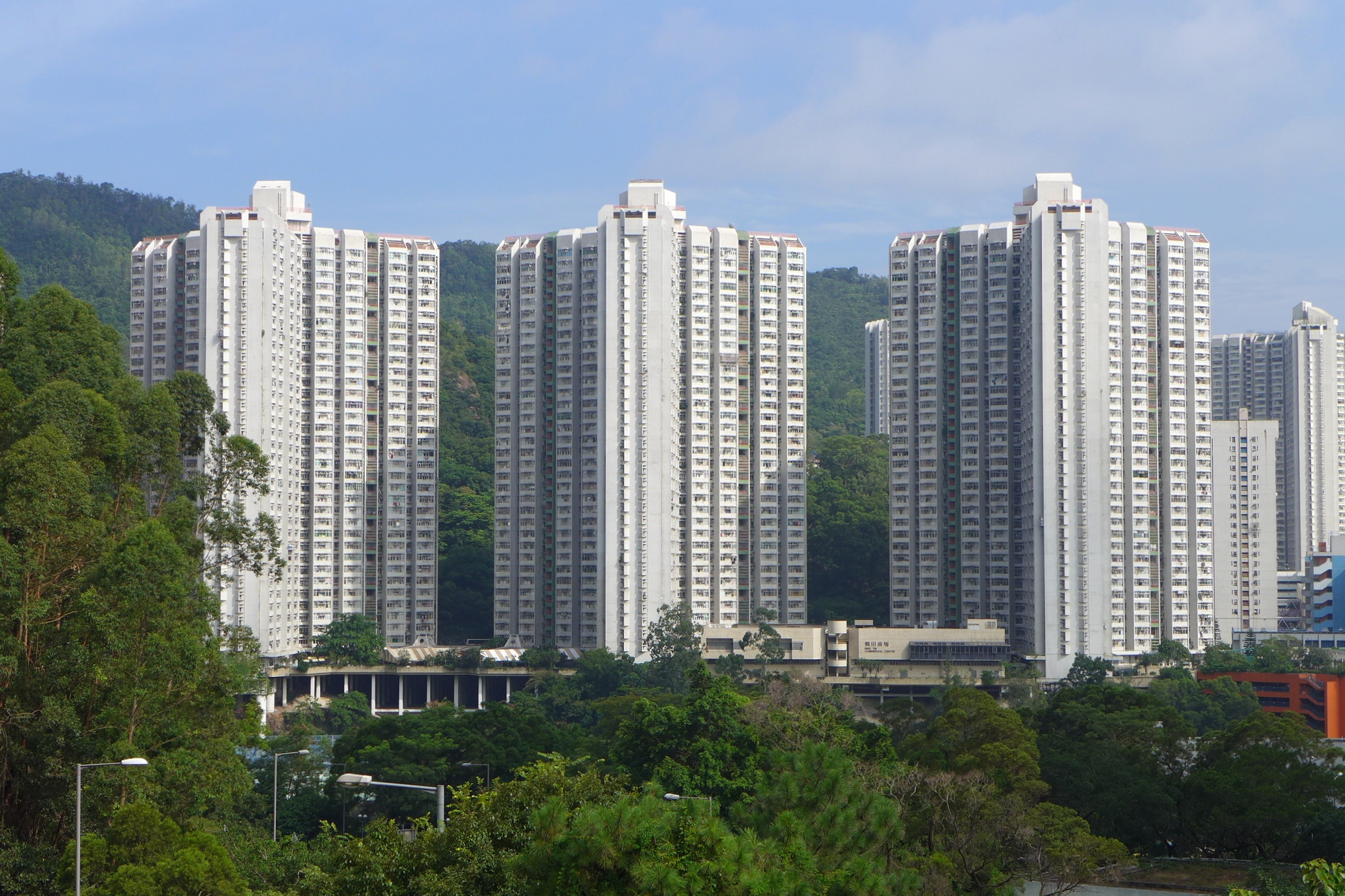
Hing Tin Estate

Hing Tin Estate (Chinese: 興田邨) is a mixed public and TPS estate at the north of Lam Tin, near the Kwun Tong side exit of Tseung Kwan O Tunnel. It consists of 3 blocks completed in 1987. Some of the flats were sold to tenants during Tenants Purchase Scheme Phase 4 in 2001.

=== Houses ===
Name	Type	Completion
Choi Tin House	Trident 3	1987
Mei Tin House	Trident 3	1987
Yan Tin House	Trident 3	1987

== Hong Nga Court ==
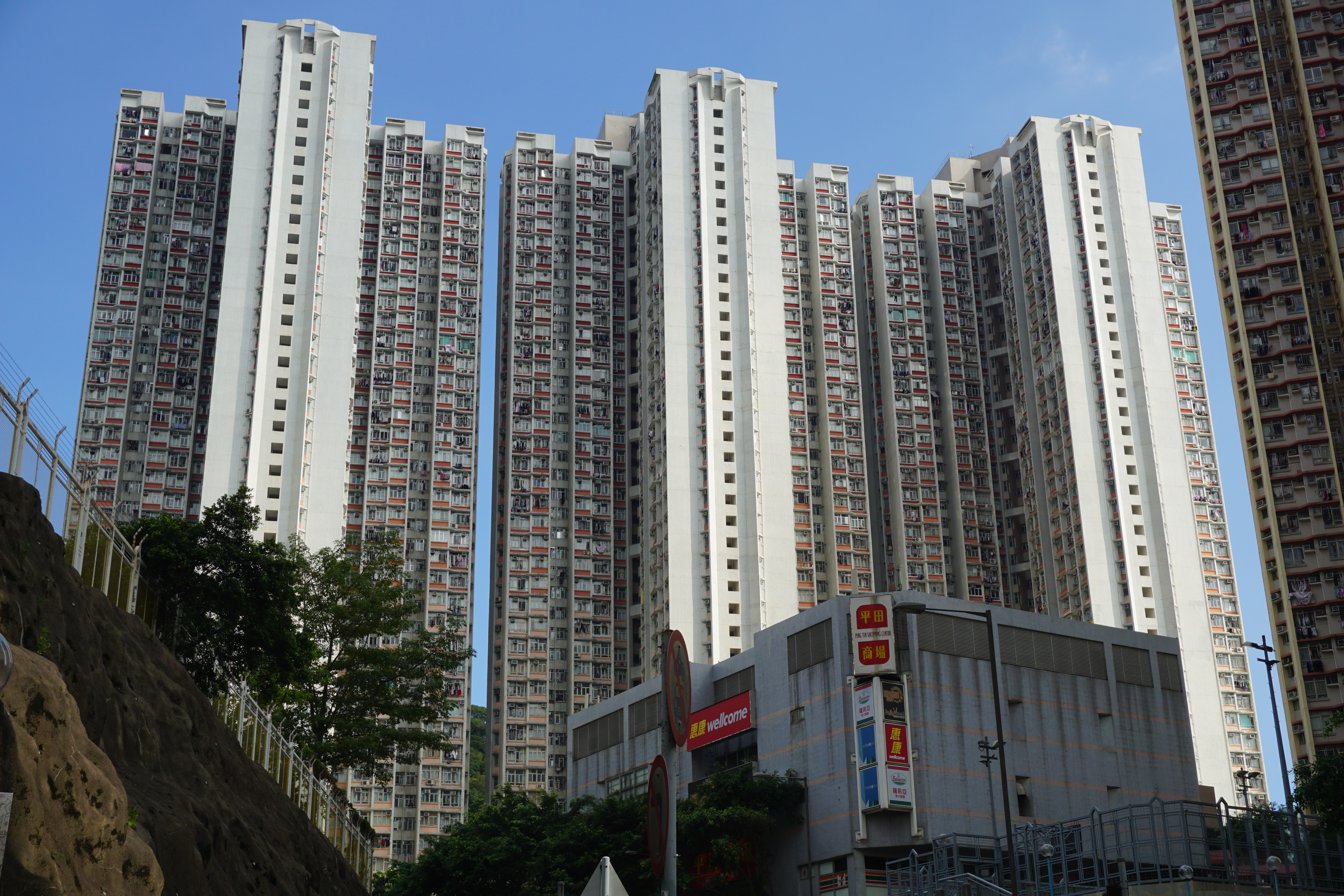
Hong Nga Court

Hong Nga Court (Chinese: 康雅苑) is a HOS court in Lam Tin, near Tak Tin Estate. It has 3 blocks built in 1993.

=== Houses ===
Name	Type	Completion
Tao Nga House	Harmony 1	1993
Lai Nga House	Harmony 1	1993
Heng Nga House	Harmony 1	1993

== Hong Pak Court ==
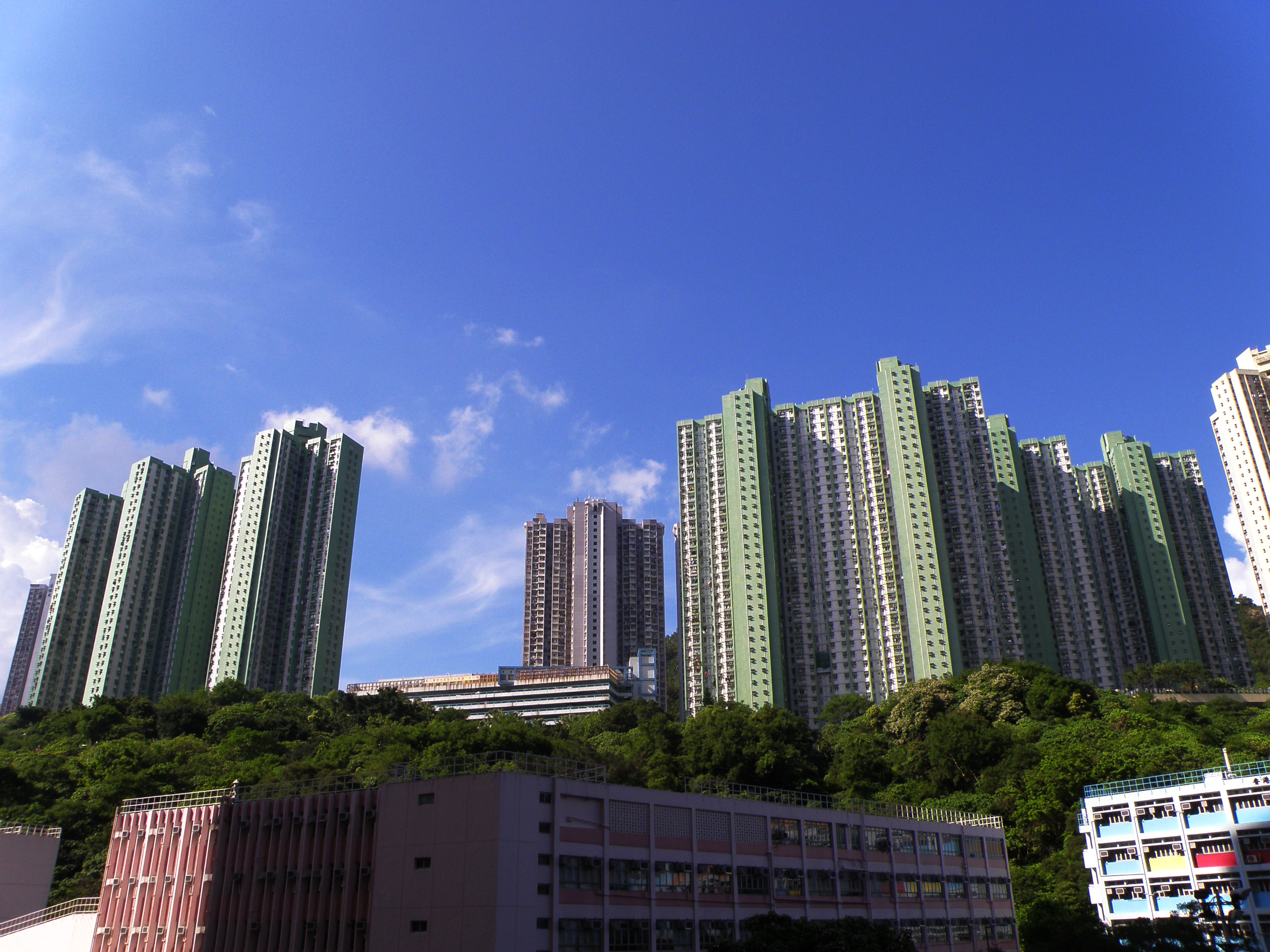
Hong Pak Court

Hong Pak Court (Chinese: 康栢苑) is a HOS court in Lam Tin, near Kwong Tin Estate. It has 7 blocks built in 1993.

=== Houses ===
Name	Type	Completion
Chung Pak House	NCB(Ver.1984)	1993
Lung Pak House	NCB(Ver.1984)	1993
Cheung Pak House	NCB(Ver.1984)	1993
Shui Pak House	NCB(Ver.1984)	1993
Yan Pak House	NCB(Ver.1984)	1993
Wing Pak House	NCB(Ver.1984)	1993
Kam Pak House	NCB(Ver.1984)	1993

== Hong Shui Court ==
Hong Shui Court (Chinese: 康瑞苑) is a HOS court in Lam Tin, near Kwong Tin Estate. It has 1 block built in 1999.

=== House ===
Name	Type	Completion
Hong Shui Court	NCB(Ver.1984)	1999

== Hong Tin Court ==
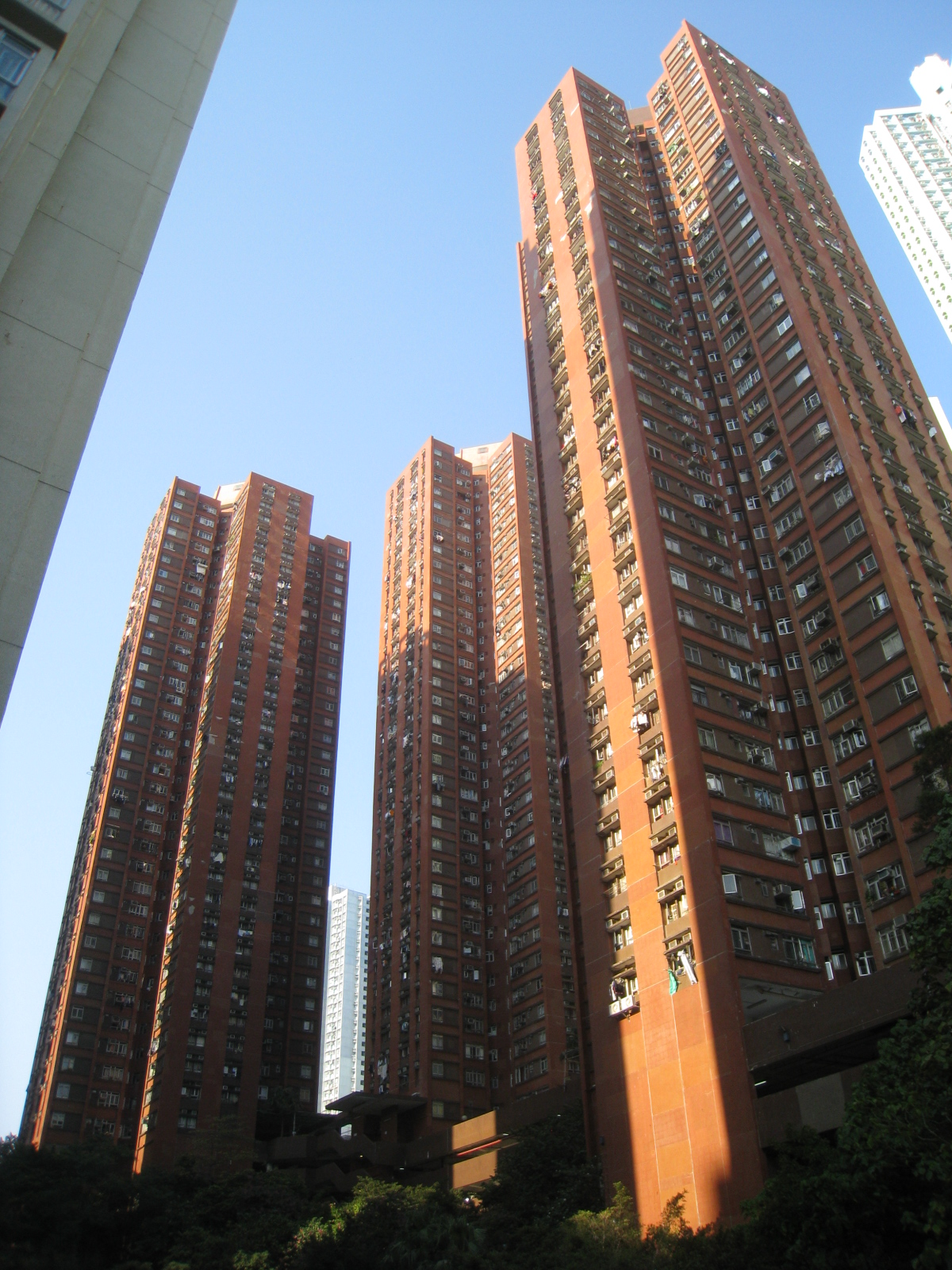
Hong Tin Court

Hong Tin Court (Chinese: 康田苑) is a HOS court in Lam Tin, near Kai Tin Estate and MTR Lam Tin station. It has 3 blocks built in 1982, and it is the oldest HOS court in Lam Tin.

=== Houses ===
Name	Type	Completion
Yue Hong House	Flexi 1	1982
Wo Hong House	Flexi 1	1982
Kei Hong House	Flexi 1	1982

== Hong Wah Court ==
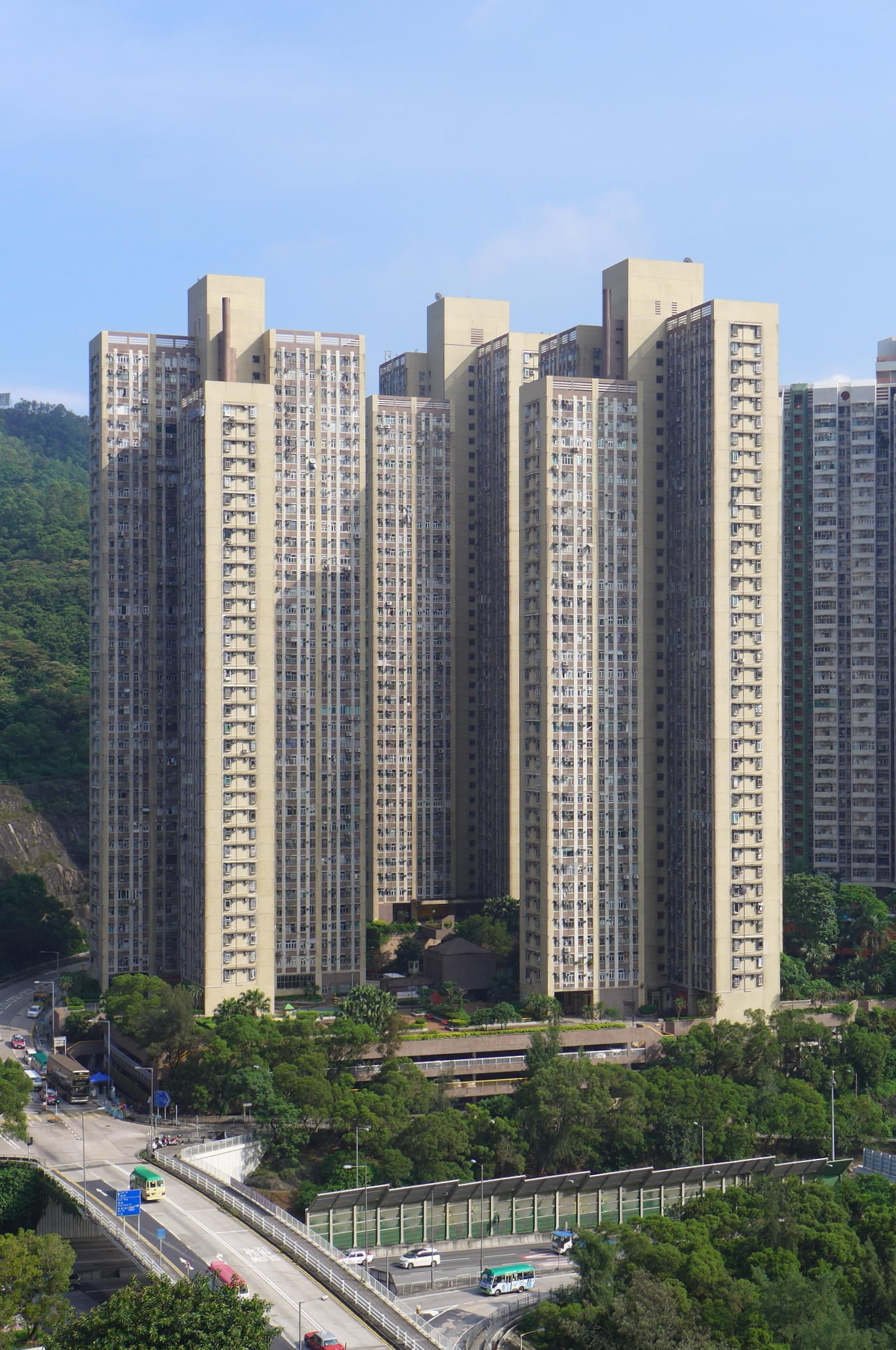
Hong Wah Court

Hong Wah Court (Chinese: 康華苑) is a HOS court in Lam Tin, near Hing Tin Estate. It has 3 blocks built in 1987.

=== Houses ===
Name	Type	Completion
Wang Hong House	Windmill	1987
Yee Hong House	Windmill	1987
Chung Hong House	Windmill	1987

== Hong Yat Court ==
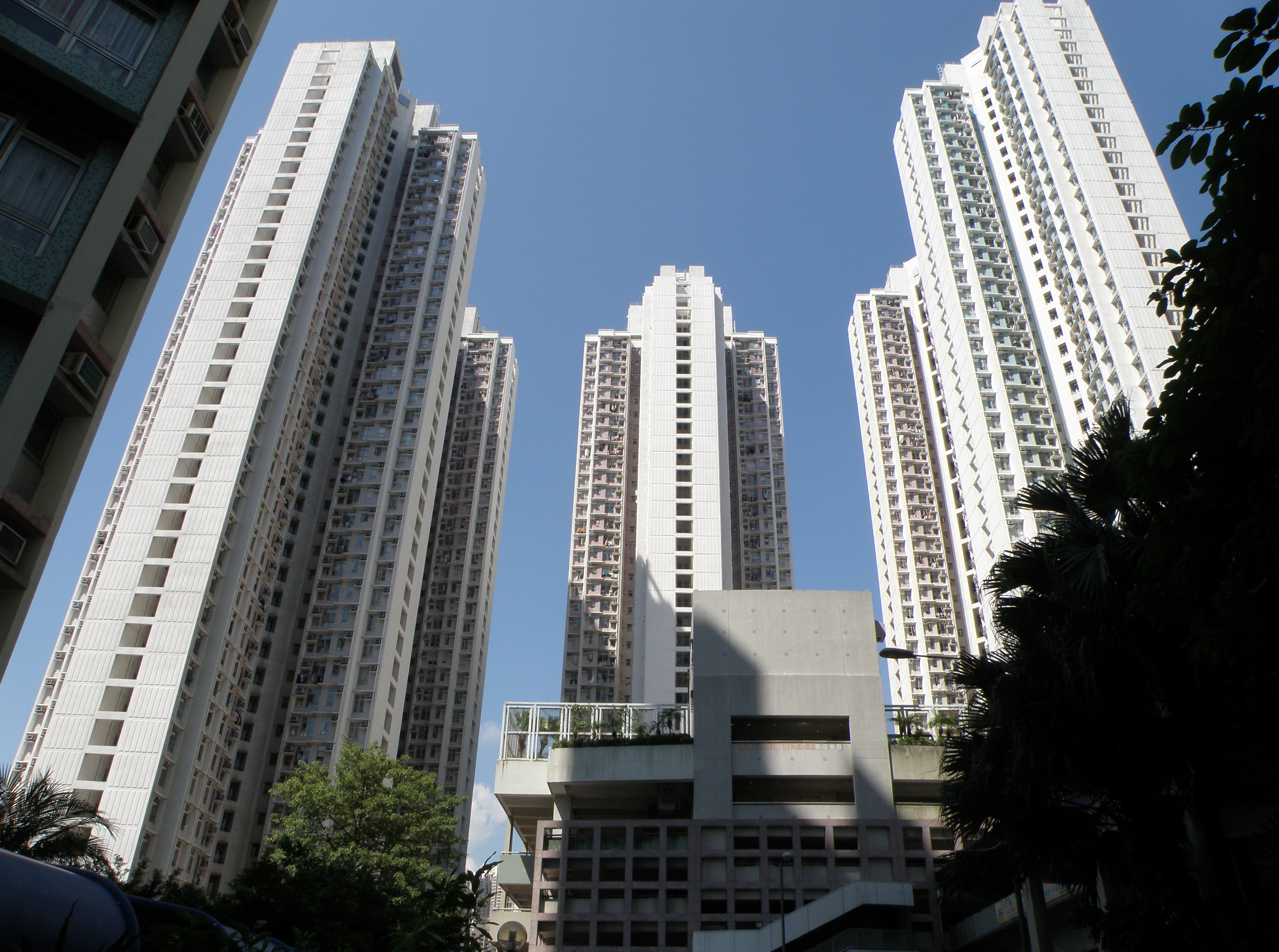
Hong Yat Court

Hong Yat Court (Chinese: 康逸苑) is a HOS court in Lam Tin, near Kai Tin Estate, Lam Tin Estate and MTR Lam Tin station. It belonged to Phase 5 of the Lam Tin Redevelopment Project. It has 5 blocks built in 2001.

=== Houses ===
Name	Type	Completion
Hong King House	Concord 1	2001
Hong Nin House	Concord 1	2001
Hong Yu House	Concord 1	2001
Hong Lai House	Concord 1	2001
Hong Ting House	Concord 1	2001

== Hong Ying Court ==
Hong Ying Court (Chinese: 康盈苑) is a HOS court in Lam Tin, near Tak Tin Estate. It has 1 block built in 1991.

=== House ===
Name	Type	Completion
Hong Ying Court	Trident 3	1991

== Kai Tin Estate ==
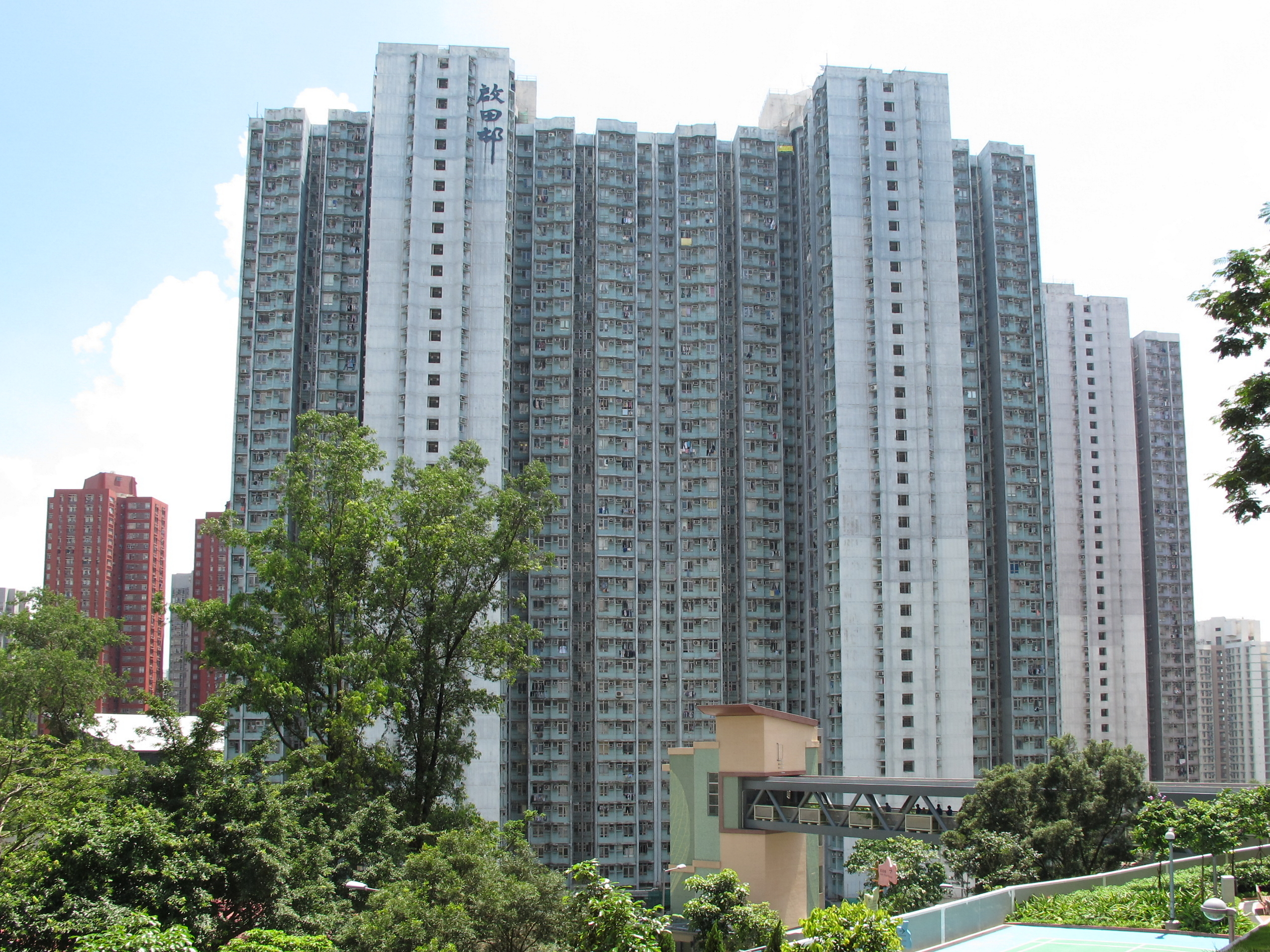
Kai Tin Estate

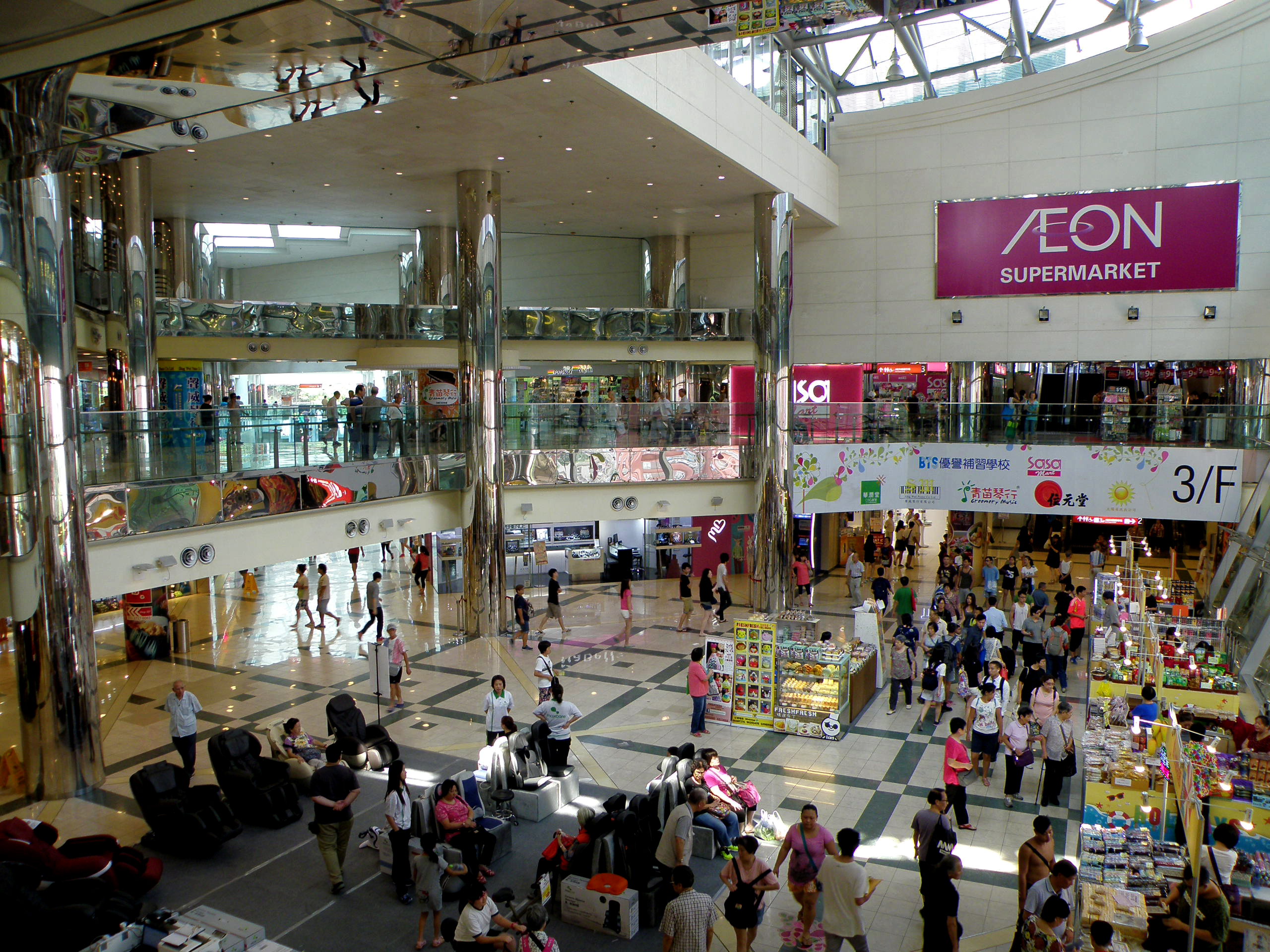
Kai Tin Shopping Centre

Kai Tin Estate (Chinese: 啟田邨) formed part of the Lam Tin Estate redevelopment project. It consists of 3 blocks and a shopping centre built in 1997.

=== Houses ===
Name	Type	Completion
Kai Shun House	Harmony 1	1997
Kai Wong House	Harmony 1	1997
Kai Yan House	Harmony 1	1997

== Kwong Tin Estate ==
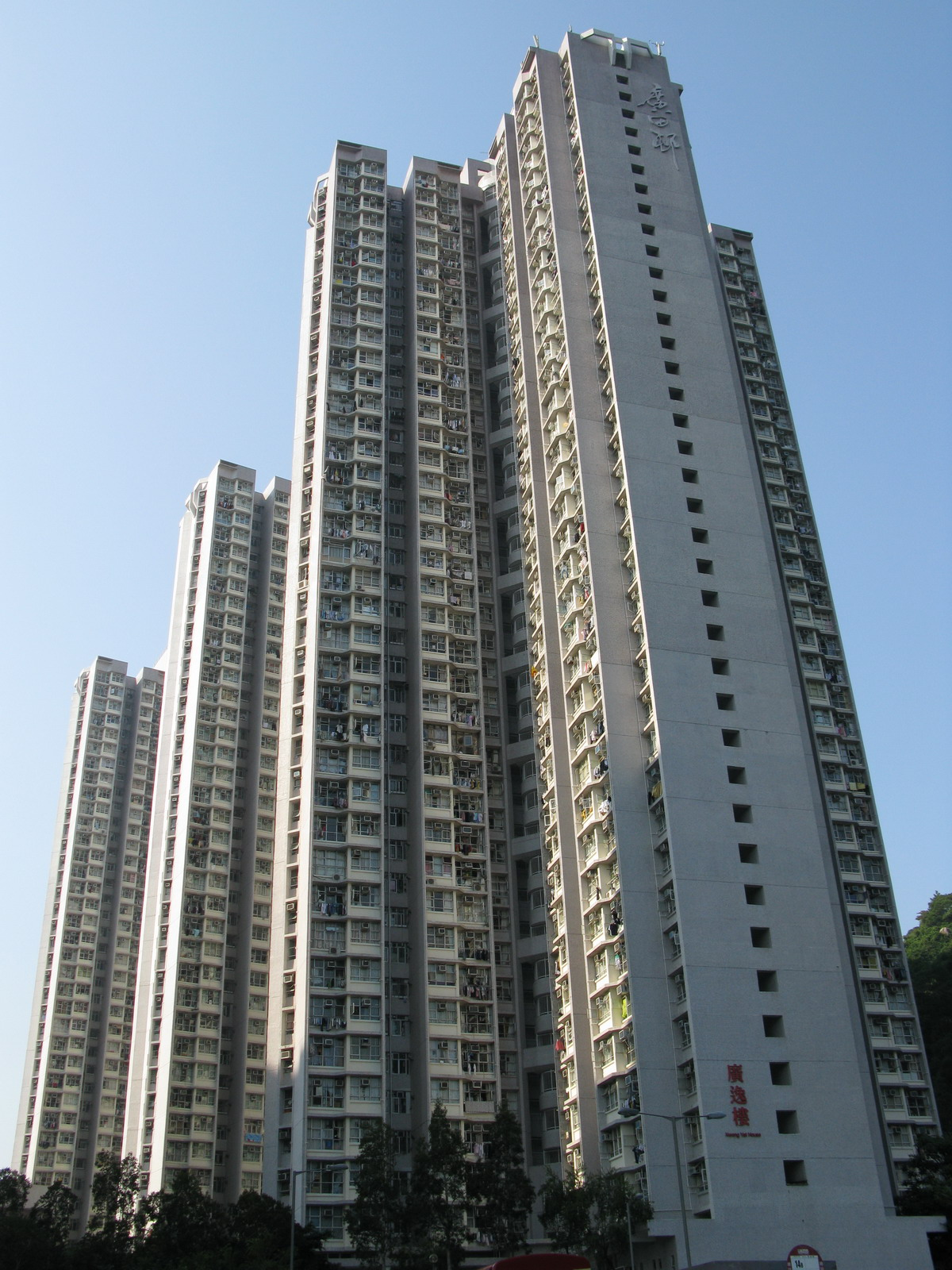
Kwong Tin Estate

Kwong Tin Estate (Chinese: 廣田邨) is located between Lam Tin and Yau Tong. It has four blocks built in 1992 and 1993.It also has the first Harmony block in Hong Kong.

=== Houses ===
Name	Type	Completion
Kwong Ching House	Harmony 3	1992
Kwong Hin House	Harmony 1	1993
Kwong Ngar House	Harmony 1	1993
Kwong Yat House	Harmony 1	1993

== Lei On Court ==
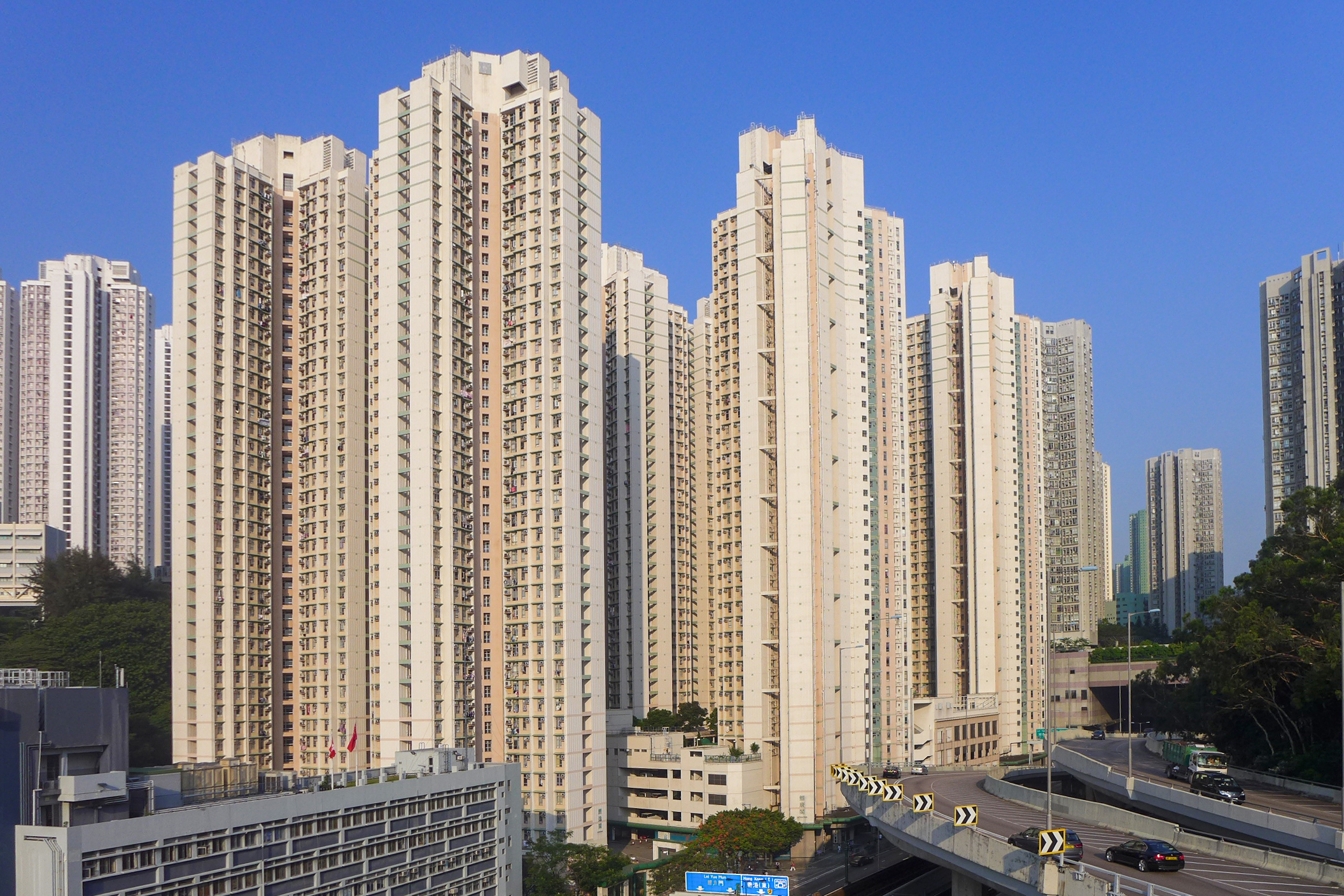
Lei On Court

Lei On Court (Chinese: 鯉安苑) is a HOS estate in Lei Yue Mun Road, Lam Tin, Kwun Tong, Kowloon, Hong Kong, located near MTR Lam Tin station. Built in 2002, it consists of six Concord-typed blocks, providing a total of 1684 flats. Blocks A, D, E and F are built in conjunction with the carpark building, whereas Block B and C stand separately at the northwest of the Court.

=== Background ===
Lei On Court was built at the former site of a public housing estate, Kwun Tong (Lei Yue Mun Road) Estate (Chinese: 觀塘(鯉魚門道)邨) (which is different from the current Lei Yue Mun Estate). Kwun Tong (Lei Yue Mun Road) Estate was built in 1962 and demolished in 1997. It was replaced by the current Lei On Court, an HOS estate.

=== Houses ===
Name	Type	Completion
Lei Hong House	Single Aspect Concord	2002
Lei Yat House	Concord 1	2002
Lei Yan House	Concord 1	2002
Lei Yi House	Concord 1	2002
Lei King House	Concord 1	2002
Lei Ting House	Single Aspect Concord	2002

== On Tin Estate ==
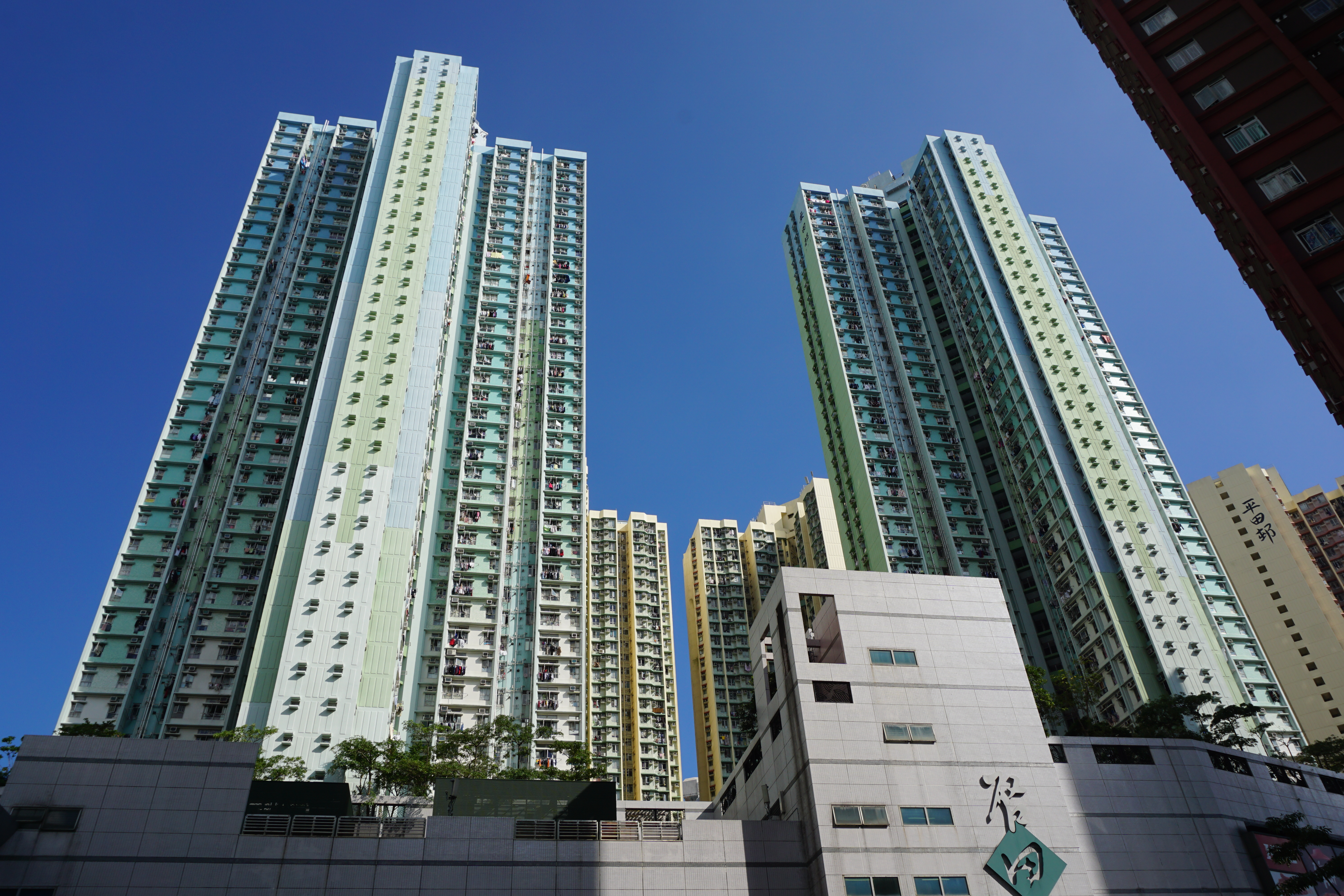
On Tin Estate

On Tin Estate (Chinese: 安田邨) was a part of Lam Tin Estate Redevelopment Project. Built above Kai Tin Shopping Centre Extension, the estate has two block completed in 2005.

=== Houses ===
Name	Type	Completion
On Kin House	New Cruciform Block (Ver.1999)	2005
On Lai House	New Cruciform Block (Ver.1999)	2005

== Ping Tin Estate ==
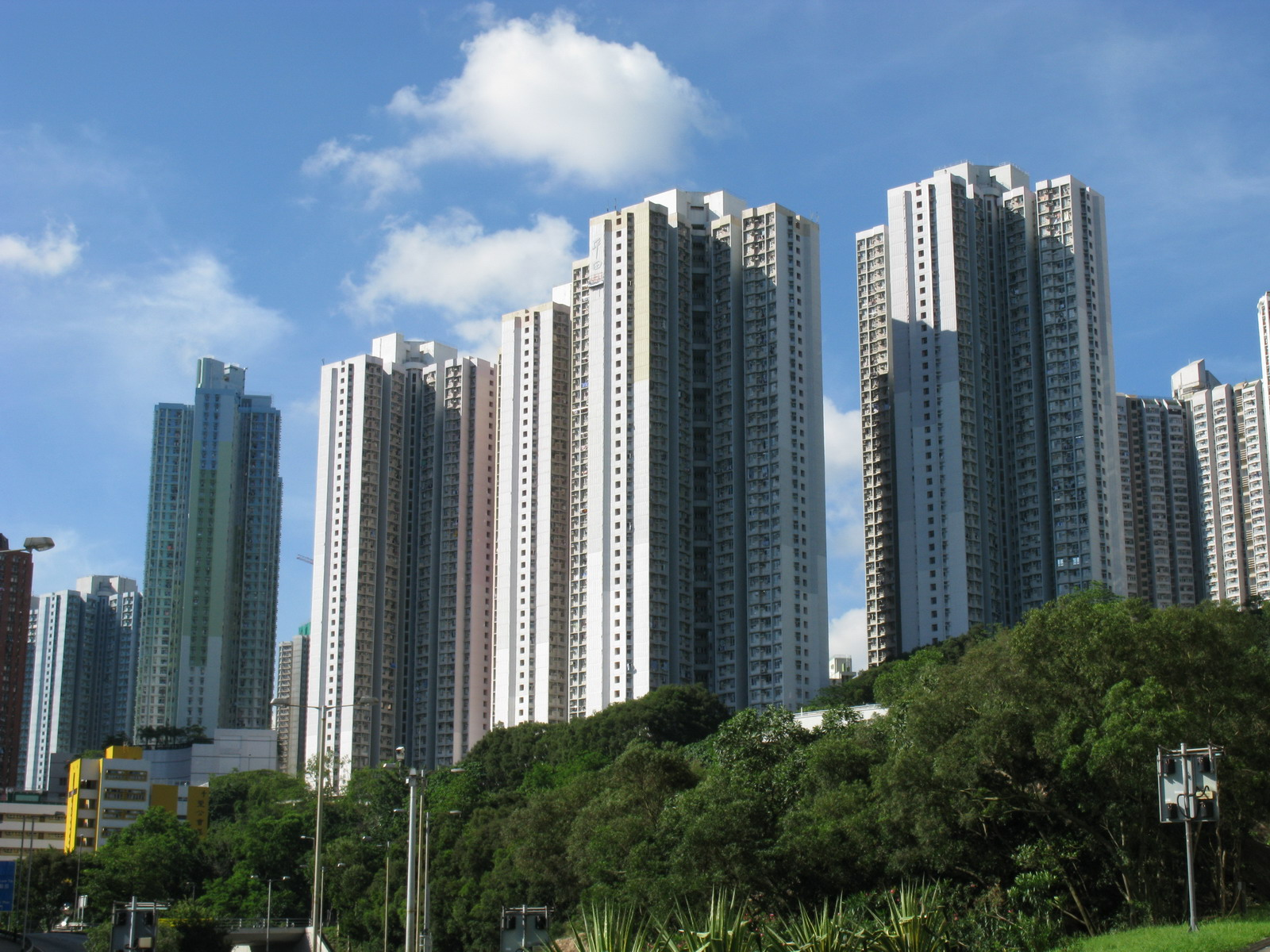
Ping Tin Estate

Ping Tin Estate (Chinese: 平田邨) was a part of Lam Tin Estate Redevelopment Project. It consists of 8 blocks (including one Ancillary Facilities Block for Housing for Senior Citizen) completed in 1997 and 1998.

=== Houses ===
Name	Type	Completion
Ping Shun House	Harmony 1	1997
Ping Yan House	Harmony 1	1997
Ping Wong House	Harmony 1	1997
Ping Shing House	Harmony 1	1997
Ping Chun House	Non-standard	1998
Ping Sin House	Non-standard	1998
Ping Mei House	Non-standard	1998
Ancillary Facilities Block	Housing for Senior Citizen	1998

== Tak Tin Estate ==
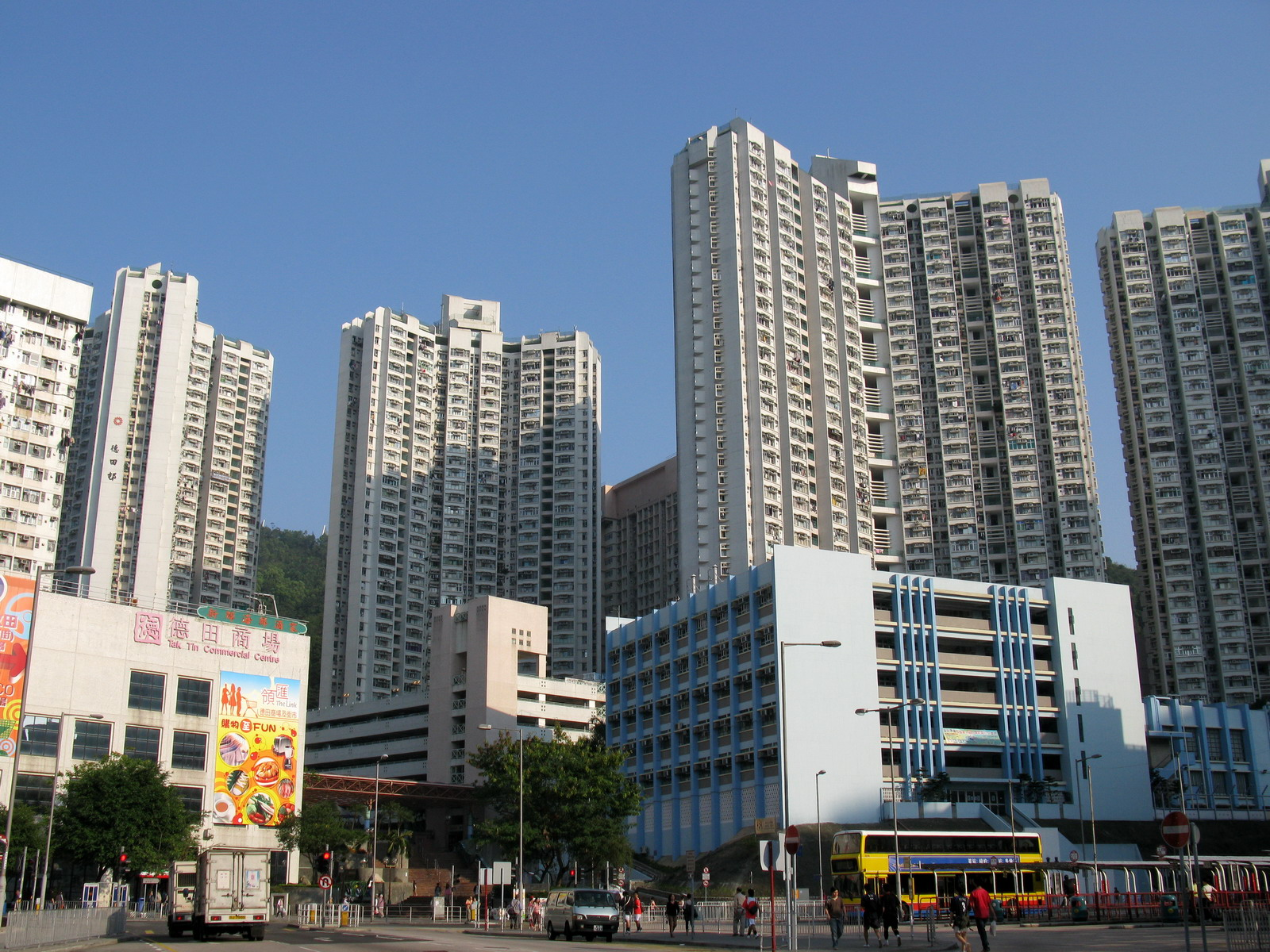
Tak Tin Estate

Tak Tin Estate (Chinese: 德田邨) is a mixed public/TPS estate in Lam Tin, near Ping Tin Estate and Lam Tin Estate. It consists of 9 blocks completed in 1991 and 2001. In 1999, some of the flats (Tak Hong House and Tak Yan House excluded) were sold to tenants through Tenants Purchase Scheme Phase 2.

=== Houses ===
Name	Type	Completion
Tak King House	New Slab	1991
Tak Lai House	New Slab	1991
Tak Yee House	Trident 4	1991
Tak Lok House	Trident 4	1991
Tak Shui House	Trident 3	1991
Tak Shing House	Trident 3	1991
Tak Lung House	Trident 3	1991
Tak Hong House	Small Household Block	2001
Tak Yan House	Housing for Senior Citizen	2001

== Lam Tin Estate ==
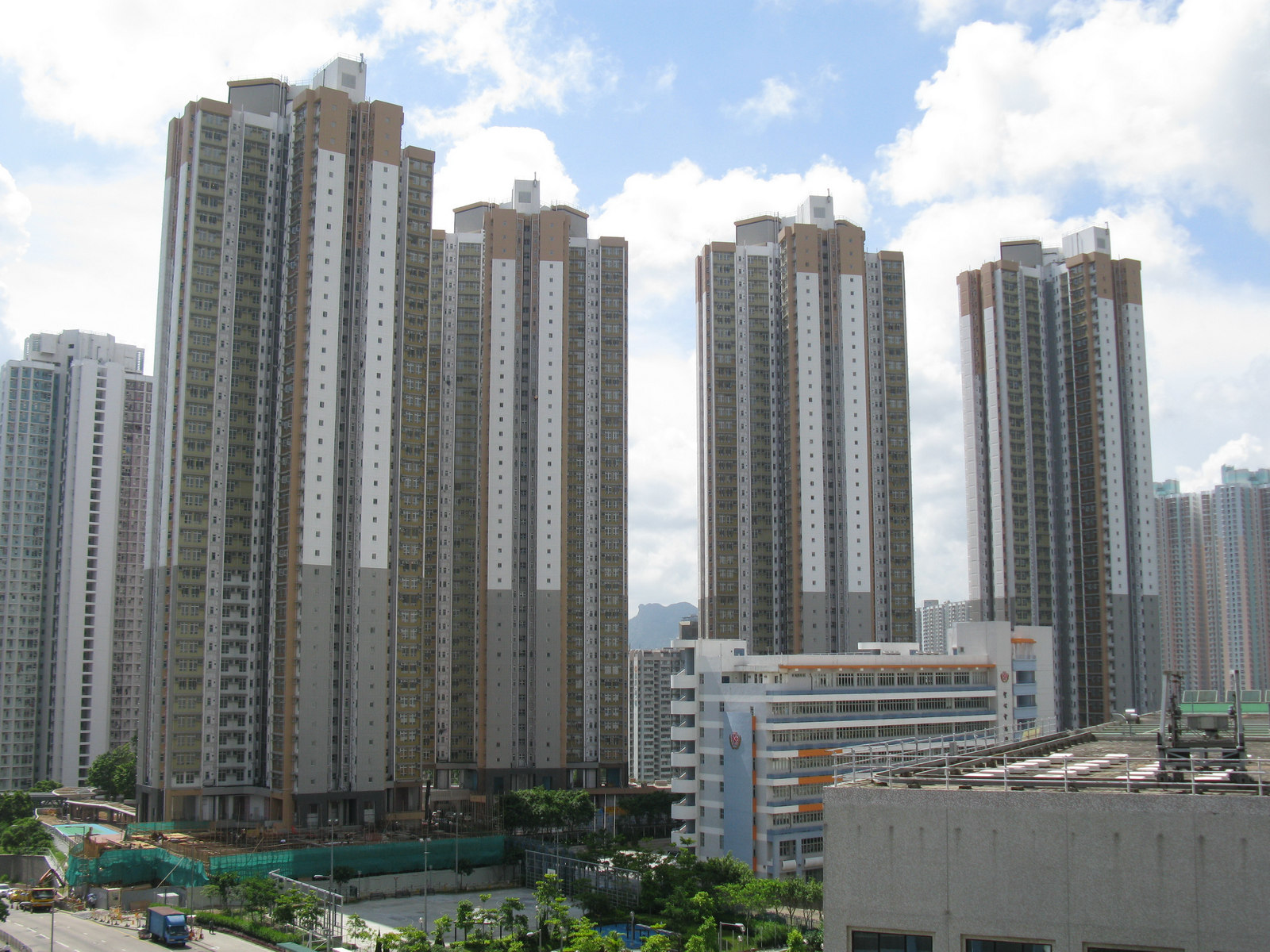
Lam Tin Estate

The current Lam Tin Estate (Chinese: 藍田邨) is smaller than the original one, and it has 4 blocks completed in 2009. Its predecessor was a resettlement estate from the 1960s to 1990s. Andy Lau, a Hong Kong famous singer, lived in Block 15 of the estate when he was a child. It was demolished between the 1990s and 2000s and its area is redeveloped to construct Kai Tin Estate, Ping Tin Estate, On Tin Estate, Hong Yat Court and the new Lam Tin Estate. Andy Lau also autographed 'Lam Tin Estate' in Chinese calligraphy at the time of the estate completion.

=== Houses ===
Name	Type	Completion
Lam Fai House	Non-standard blocks (cruciform design)	2009
Lam Tai House	Non-standard blocks (cruciform design)	2009
Lam Bik House	Non-standard blocks (cruciform design)	2009
Lam Wai House	Non-standard blocks (cruciform design)	2009
