= Environmentally Friendly Linkage System =

Transport project in Kai Tak, Hong Kong

Kai Tak Smart and Green Mass Transit System
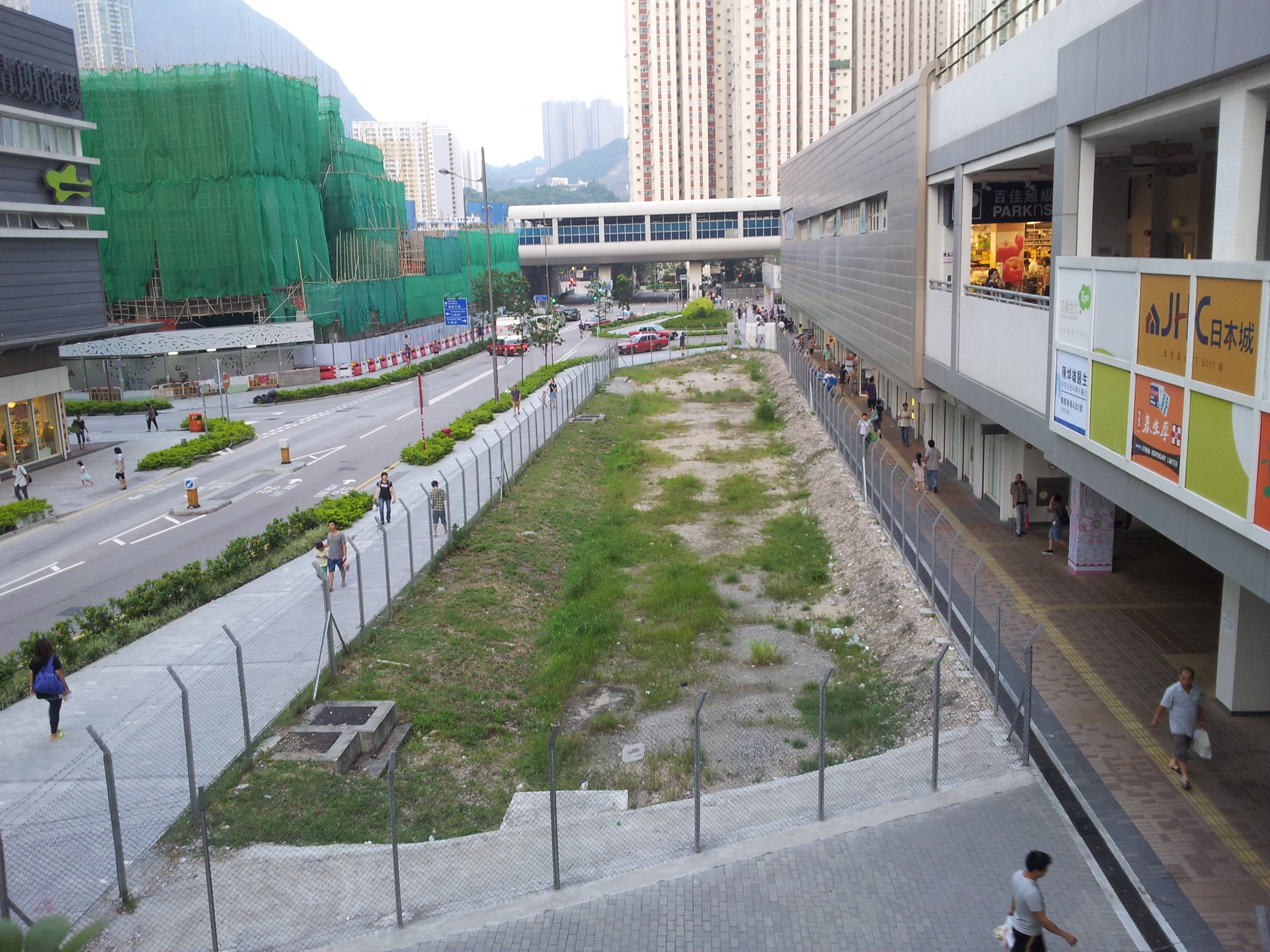
- Railway reserve at Ching Long Shopping Centre

Overview
- Other name: Kai Tak Monorail
- Native name: 啟德智慧綠色集體運輸系統
- Status: Under planning
- Locale: New Kowloon
- Termini: Kai Tak station; Kai Tak Cruise Terminal
- Stations: 5
- Website: www.ktd.gov.hk/efls

Service
- Depot(s): Site of the current Kowloon Bay Vehicle Examination Centre

Technical
- Line length: 9 km (5.6 mi)
- Character: Elevated and grade-separated
Route map

Environmentally Friendly Linkage System
- Traditional Chinese: 環保連接系統
- Simplified Chinese: 环保连接系统
Transcriptions
Standard Mandarin
- Hanyu Pinyin: Huánbǎo Liánjiē Xìtǒng
Yue: Cantonese
- Yale Romanization: Wàahnbóu Lìhnjip Haihtúng
- Jyutping: waan4 bou2 lin4 zip3 hai6 tung2

Kai Tak Monorail
- Traditional Chinese: 啟德單軌鐵路
- Simplified Chinese: 启德单轨铁路
Transcriptions
Standard Mandarin
- Hanyu Pinyin: Qǐ Dé Dānguǐ Tiělù
Yue: Cantonese
- Yale Romanization: Káidāk Dāan'gwái Titlouh

Kai Tak Smart and Green Mass Transit System (Chinese: 啟德智慧綠色集體運輸系統), also known as the Kai Tak Monorail (啟德單軌鐵路; Káidāk Dāan'gwái Titlouh), is a government-proposed monorail system to be located in the Kai Tak Development area of Hong Kong with 5 stations.

The system was first proposed in 2012 and was expected to be completed in 2023, at a cost of HK$12 billion, and to take up 15 percent of public transport in the Kowloon East Development. It was scrapped officially in 2020, but revived in 2023.

== History ==
Throughout the 1990s, a number of master plans were drawn up to prepare for the eventual reuse of the Kai Tak airport land. The South East Kowloon Development Statement (1993) and the Feasibility Study for South East Kowloon Development (1998) both proposed that the site be served by two conventional Mass Transit Railway lines running underground. A 2001 study removed the line serving the former runway area, replacing it with a proposed "trolley bus or light rail system". In light of the Protection of the Harbour Ordinance and overwhelming public opinion against further reclamation of Victoria Harbour, the plan for Kai Tak was further cut back. But this basic premise of a light rail system in the area would eventually turn into the plan for a monorail.

In 2007, the Kai Tak Outline Zoning Plans with railway connection system was approved by the Executive Council.

The project, officially called the Environmentally Friendly Linkage System (Chinese: 環保連接系統; Cantonese Yale: Wàahnbóu Lìhnjip Haihtúng) and abbreviated to EFLS, was headed by the Development Bureau with public consultation carried out by the Civil Engineering and Development Department.

The Civil Engineering and Development Department appointed consultants to review the flexibility of the EFLS.

Under the 2011-2012 Policy Address, Kowloon East would become the city's second central business district.

However, in the 2020 policy address, chief executive Carrie Lam approvingly cited a feasibility study suggesting that the EFLS should instead comprise a multi-modal system of buses, minibuses, travellators, and cycling and pedestrian infrastructure, rather than a railway system, which implied that the monorail plan had been shelved. Footbridges with travellators were proposed subsequently as an alternative.

On 12 March 2024, a similar environmentally friendly transit system was proposed, but it would only serve Kai Tak and not connect to Kwun Tong as per the original plan.

== Technology debate ==
Hong Kong Tramways Limited proposed building a modern tramway, instead of a monorail, on the grounds of lower construction cost, more affordable fares, lower operating cost, improved flexibility for future extensions, less visual impact, no noise pollution, and socio-economic benefits. Norman Y. S. Heung, project manager from the Civil Engineering and Development Department, responded that it would not be acceptable for a tramway to share ground space with cars. Emmanuel Vivant, general manager of Hong Kong Tramways, responded that "in a city that rightly prides itself on putting priority on public transport, and where only 10 per cent of trips are done by private car, it should not be impossible to allocate space to tram lanes that can each carry eight times as many people as a road lane" and that "promoting usage of emission-free modern tramways rather than polluting private cars, would be a perfectly sensible policy decision. Where necessary, the modern tramway can simply share space with other road users".

The need for heavy construction of any kind was challenged by the Hong Kong Cycling Alliance, on the basis that the 13-kilometre cycling network already planned for the area provided viable and more flexible connectivity, at much lower environmental impact.

The South China Morning Post claimed that a "green bus network" would cost less than HK$400 million, and could still make a profit.

== Finances ==
The cost of construction at 2010 prices was HK$12 billion, with patronage expected to hit 200,000 by 2031, according to the government. In 2012 officials estimated that building a monorail would have yielded a return of one per cent, versus four per cent for a conventional railway. The Post reported that the system would break even only if the government bore the capital and asset replacement costs.

== Stations ==
=== Latest proposal ===
Station Name		Interchange	Opening date	District
English	Chinese	Interchange	Opening date	District
Kai Tak Smart and Green Mass Transit System
Kai Tak station	啟德站	Tuen Ma line (MTR)	Expected to open in 2031 or 2032	Kowloon City District
Kai Tak Sports Park	啟德體育園		Expected to open in 2031 or 2032	Kowloon City District
Metro Park	都會公園		Expected to open in 2031 or 2032	Kowloon City District
Residential Belt at Former Runway Area	前跑道區住宅帶		Expected to open in 2031 or 2032	Kowloon City District
Kai Tak Cruise Terminal	啟德郵輪碼頭		Expected to open in 2031 or 2032	Kowloon City District

=== Abandoned proposal ===
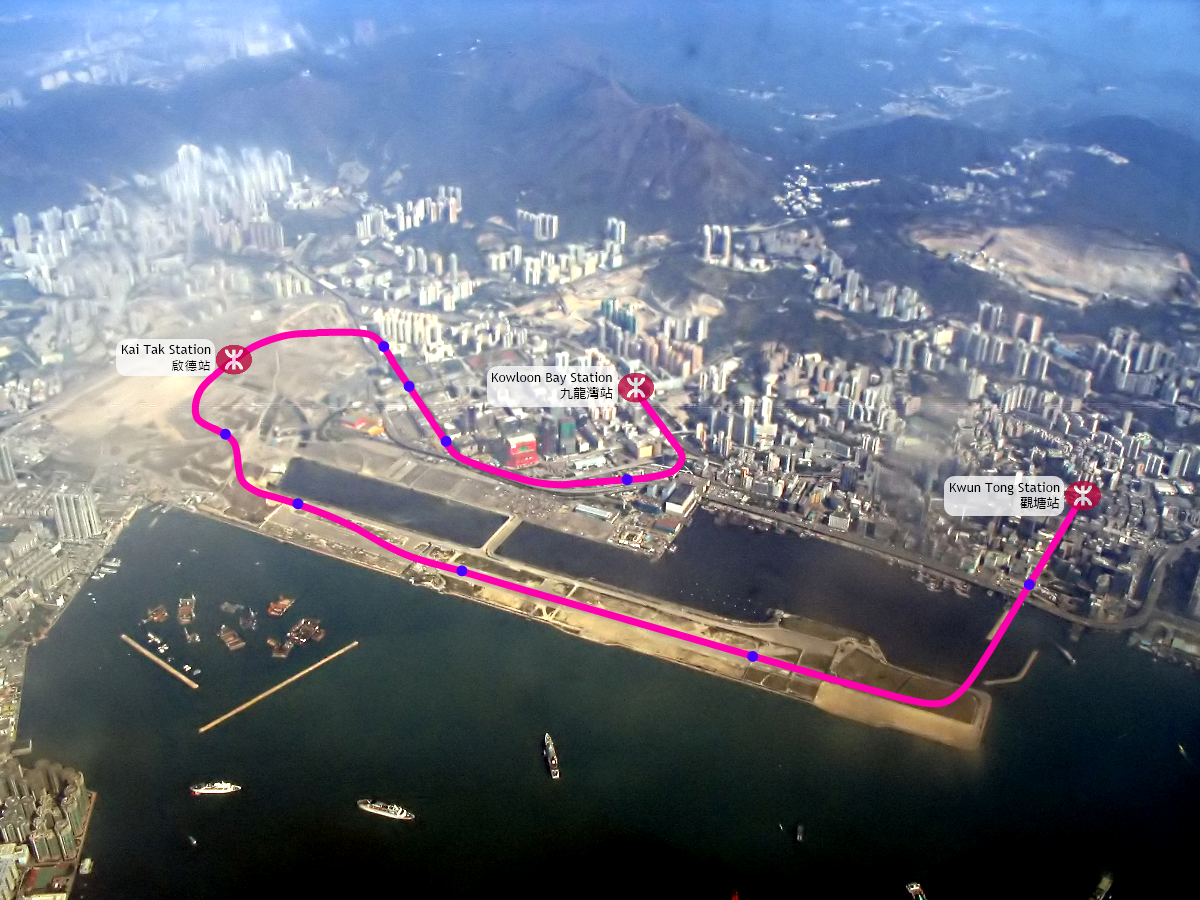
Proposed alignment of the monorail overlaid on a 2009 photo

Logo of Environmentally Friendly Linkage System project

The MTR walk‐in catchment coverage has usually a 500-metre radius or less than 8-minute walking time. After considering estimated passenger and fire safety issues, the Civil Engineering and Development Department took the MTR walk-in catchment coverage as an indicator for the selection of the EFLS station site.

Station Name		Interchange	Opening date	District
English	Chinese	Interchange	Opening date	District
Environmentally Friendly Linkage System
Kowloon Bay station	九龍灣總站	Kwun Tong line (MTR)	Expected 2023	Kwun Tong District
Hoi Bun Road	海濱道		Expected 2023	Kwun Tong District
Kowloon Bay Business Area	九龍灣商貿區		Expected 2023	Kwun Tong District
Kai Cheung Road	啟祥道		Expected 2023	Kwun Tong District
Richland Gardens	麗晶花園		Expected 2023	Kwun Tong District
Station Square	車站廣場	Tuen Ma line (MTR)	Expected 2023	Kowloon City District
Stadium	體育場館		Expected 2023	Kowloon City District
Metro Park	都會公園		Expected 2023	Kowloon City District
Runway Precinct	跑道休閒區		Expected 2023	Kowloon City District
Cruise Terminal	郵輪碼頭		Expected 2023	Kowloon City District
Kwun Tong Ferry Pier	觀塘碼頭	Ferry to North Point	Expected 2023	Kwun Tong District
Kwun Tong station	觀塘總站	Kwun Tong line (MTR)	Expected 2023	Kwun Tong District

== Rolling stock ==
As of 2015, the government planned to use two-car monorail trains with capacities of about 250 passengers. The stations would have been designed to allow for future expansion to three-car trains.
