= Cycling in Hong Kong =

Cyclists in Hong Kong have the same rights and responsibilities as all other road users, except for prohibitions from expressways and some other designated locations, such as all tunnel areas, the Tsing Ma and Tsing Sha control areas, many elevated roads and many underpasses. At least one hand must be kept on the handlebars at all times. Cyclists must use a cycle track wherever one is present.

== Cycle tracks ==
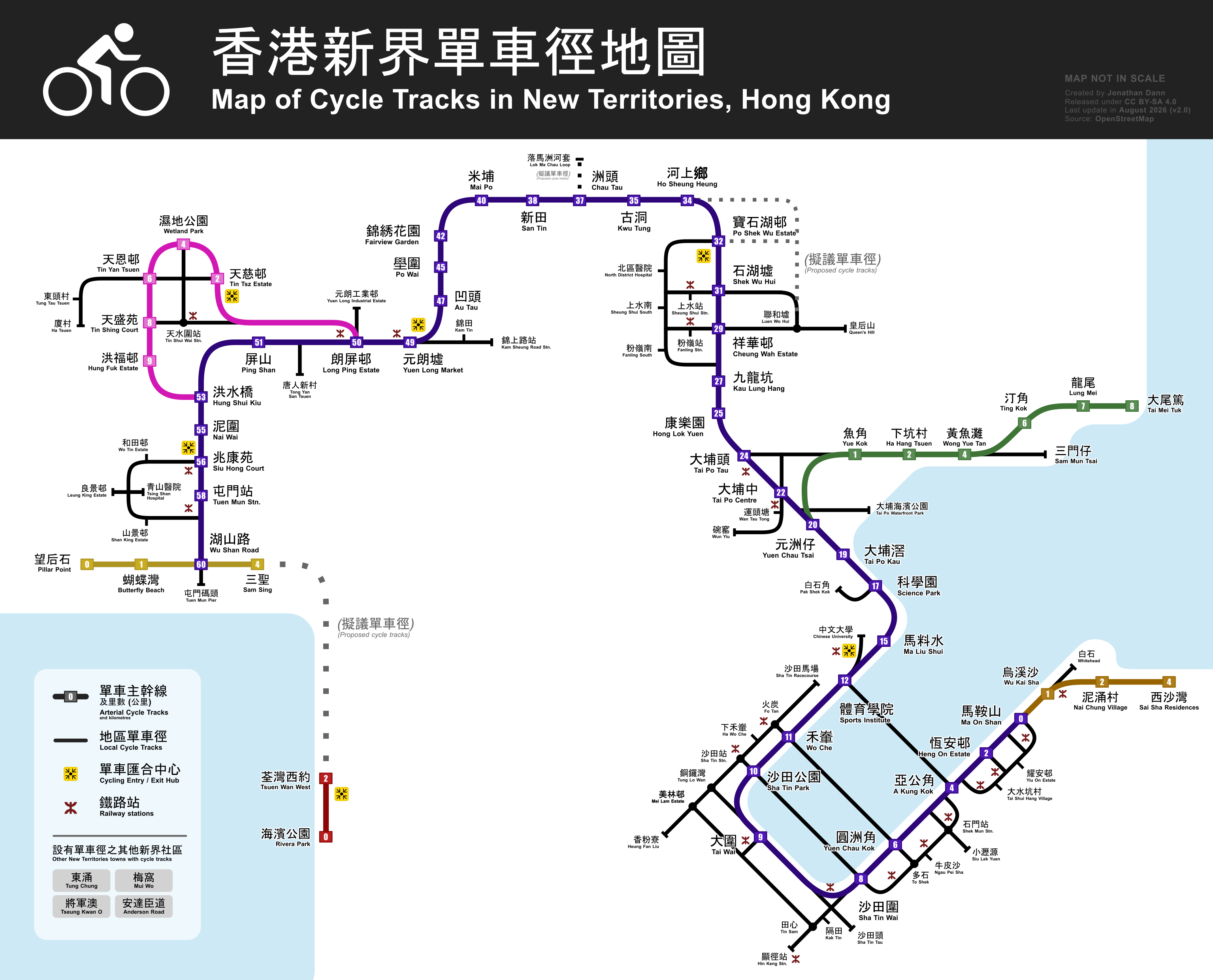
Map showing major cycling tracks in New Territories

Cycle tracks in Hong Kong are located predominantly in the New Territories, in new towns. Almost all the rules applicable on normal roads also apply on cycle tracks, as they are also roads, though motor vehicles and pedestrians are normally not allowed to enter or use them. However, apart from the prohibition of motor vehicles, most of these rules are not regularly enforced or followed.

== Mountain biking ==
The mountain bike trails approved by the Agriculture, Fisheries and Conservation Department, are:

- Sai Kung West Country Park (Wan Tsai Extension)
- Sai Kung West Country Park (Footpath between Hoi Ha Village and Wan Tsai Peninsula)
- Tai Lam Country Park (Tai Lam Mountain Bike Trail)
- Shek O Country Park (Hong Kong Trail from -Tai Tam Gap -to To Tei Wan)
- Lantau South Country Park (Catchwater road from Pui O to Kau Ling Chung)
- Lantau South Country Park (Chi Ma Wan Country Trail )
- Lantau South Country Park (Footpath on Chi Ma Wan Peninsula)
- Lantau South Country Park (Coastal trail from Mui Wo to Pui O)
- Sai Kung West Country Park (Pak Tam to Pak Sha O)
- Clear Water Bay Country Park (Ng Fai Tin to Ha Shan Tuk)

(High Junk Peak Mountain Bike Trail is not open on Sundays or public holidays)

== Bicycle-sharing ==
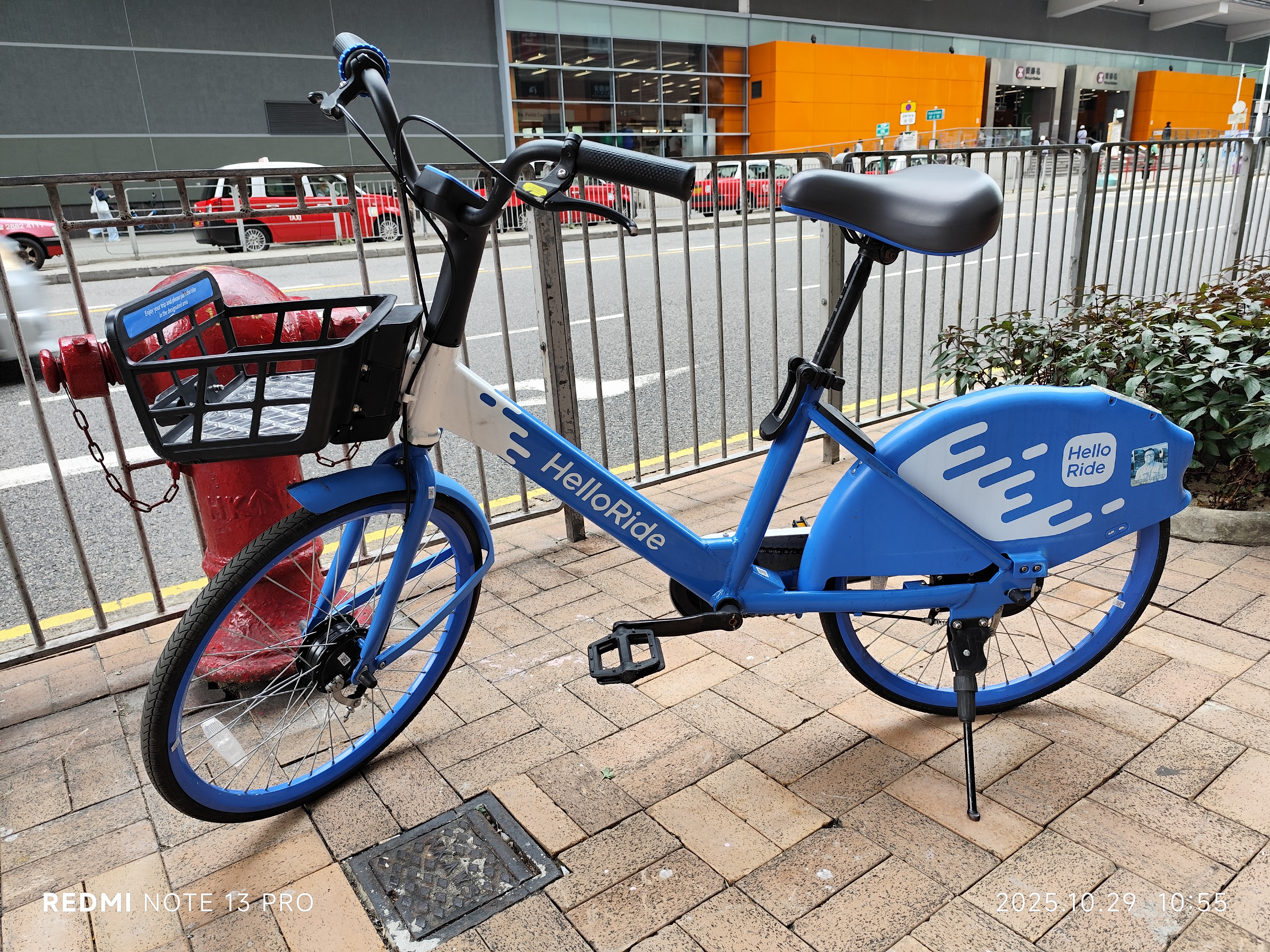
HelloRide bicycle in Po Lam

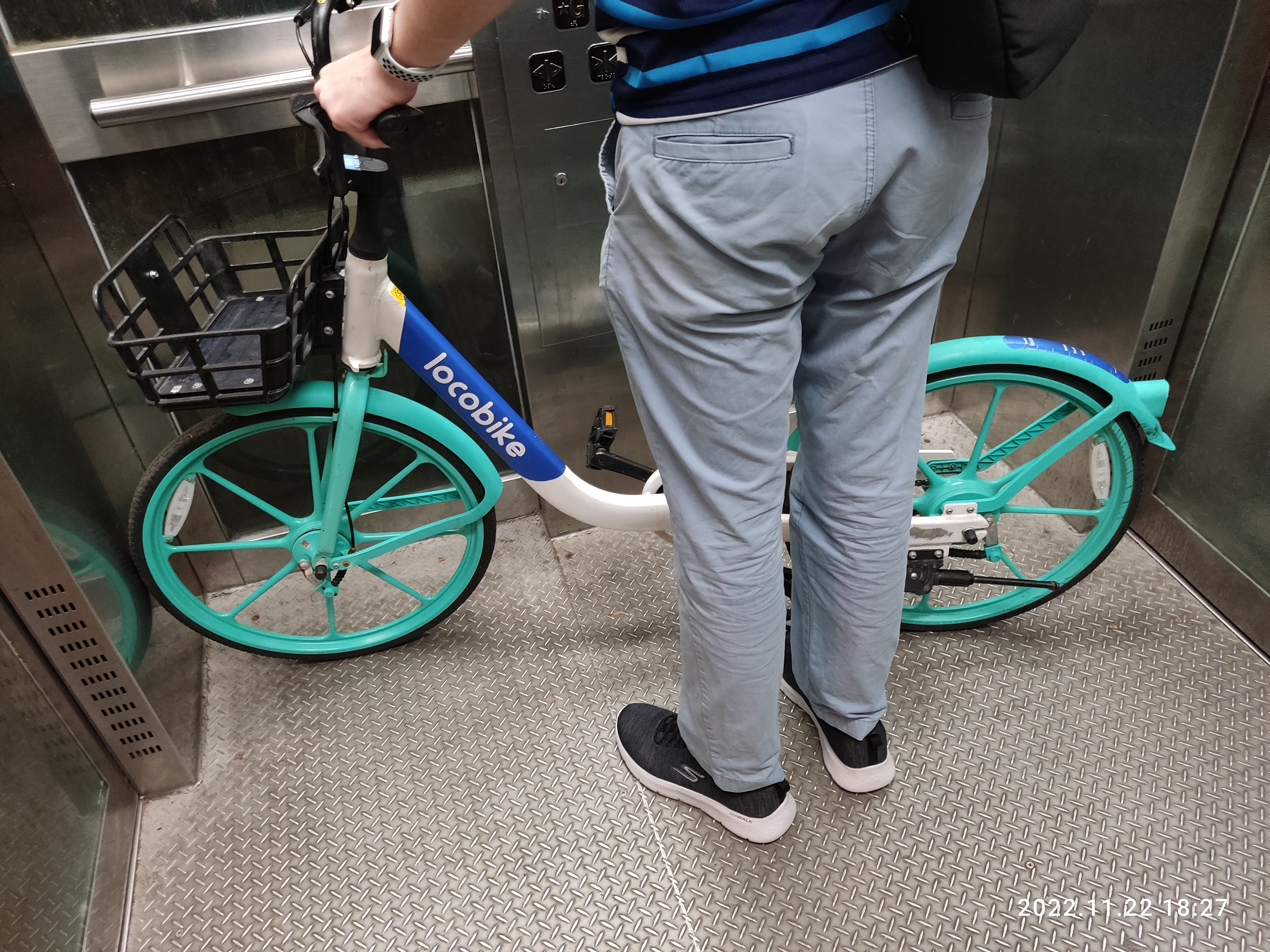
A user with a Locobike bicycle in an elevator

In May 2026, Locobike and HelloRide were the only two bicycle-sharing operators in Hong Kong. Previously, there had been a peak of seven operators competing for market share in 2017. According to HelloRide, its services are available in seven main areas: Tuen Mun, Yuen Long, Tung Chung, Sheung Shui, Tai Po, Sha Tin, and Tseung Kwan O. Locobike also covers those seven areas and additionally Ma On Shan, Tsuen Wan, and Tai Wai. Both companies require users to download their apps and use them to pay for and unlock bikes by scanning the QR code on the bicycle. All rides are required to end at designated parking zones that are shown on the app before locking the bicycle. Both operators charge around HK$20 (US$2.55) for a single-day pass and also offer monthly or quarterly unlimited passes for more frequent users.

== See also ==
- Hong Kong Cycling Alliance
- Hong Kong Cycling Association
