= Central Kowloon Bypass =

Road in Hong Kong

Central Kowloon Bypass
- Part of Route 6
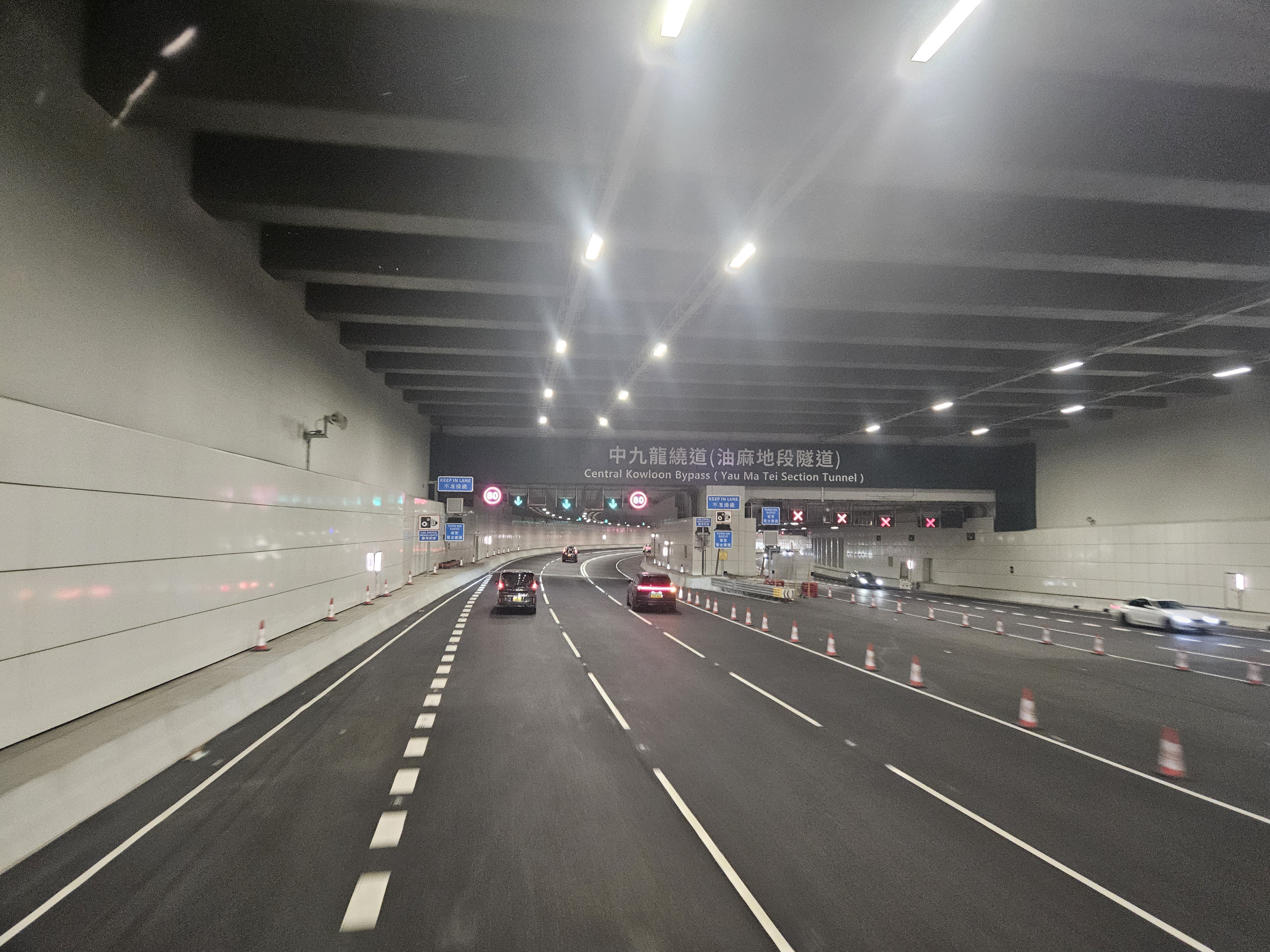
- Yau Ma Tei Section's west entrance

Route information
- Maintained by Highways Department
- Length: 7.7 km (4.8 mi)
- Status: Yau Ma Tei Section: Opened; Kowloon Bay Section: Under construction
- Existed: Yau Ma Tei Section: 21 December 2025; Kowloon Bay Section: 6 December 2026–present

Major junctions
- East end: Tseung Kwan O–Lam Tin Tunnel
- West end: West Kowloon Highway

Location
- Country: China
- Special administrative region: Hong Kong

Highway system
- Transport in Hong Kong; Routes; Roads and Streets

The Central Kowloon Bypass is a highway in Kowloon, Hong Kong. It starts from Yau Ma Tei in the west and end in Lam Tin in the east. The carriageway consists of two sections: the Yau Ma Tei Section Tunnel and the Kowloon Bay Section Tunnel.

== Overview ==
The Yau Ma Tei Section Tunnel was referred to as "Central Kowloon Route" during the construction phase. It runs through the Kowloon Peninsula, largely underground, reducing the travel time between Yau Ma Tei and Kowloon Bay from 30 minutes to five minutes. It begins at the Yau Ma Tei interchange of the West Kowloon Highway and finishes at the Kai Tak interchange, passing through (from east to west) Ma Tau Kok, Ho Man Tin and southern Yau Tsim Mong district. This section opened on 21 December 2025.

The Kowloon Bay Section Tunnel was referred to as "Trunk Road T2 and Cha Kwo Ling Tunnel" during the construction phase. A large part of the section will run underwater, beginning at the Kai Tak interchange and finishing at the Lam Tin interchange. This section is expected to open around mid-2026. The total construction cost of the Central Kowloon Bypass is HK$42 billion (approximately US$5.4 billion).

Between Yau Ma Tei and Kai Tak, there are no intermediate interchanges. The proposed alignment led to the demolition of numerous structures including the Yau Ma Tei Car Park Building, a public library, the Jade Hawker Bazaar, and the Yau Ma Tei Specialist Clinic Extension. In January 2016, the Hong Kong Executive Council approved construction of the Central Kowloon Route. The project commenced in the 4th quarter of 2017.

== Construction ==
Most of the tunnel passing underground through land was tunneled through the drill-and-blast method, where more than 2400 blasts were made. As the tunnel passed through many urban buildings in Central Kowloon including Queen Elizabeth Hospital, the construction team faced challenges, such as limiting the blasting of the tunnel underneath Queen Elizabeth Hospital to a 15 minute interval so as not to affect medical equipment there. Additionally, the tunnel passes through the underground MTR network under Nathan Road, resulting in the distance between the road and rail tunnels to be as little as 3 meters.

Also, an underwater 370 meter long tunnel had to be built connecting Ma Tau Kok and Kai Tak, where the land was partially temporarily reclaimed to facilitate this. The original seabed was then restored after construction.

== Incidents ==
In October 2020, a construction accident occurred. An excavator being lifted by a tower crane broke loose and plunged down a giant ventilation shaft in Ho Man Tin. Nobody was injured.
