= Richland Gardens =

Coordinates: 22.3302°N 114.2068°E

- Traditional Chinese: 麗晶花園
- Simplified Chinese: 丽晶花园
Transcriptions
Standard Mandarin
- Hanyu Pinyin: Líjīng Huāyuán
Yue: Cantonese
- Jyutping: lai6 zing1 faa1 jyun4*2

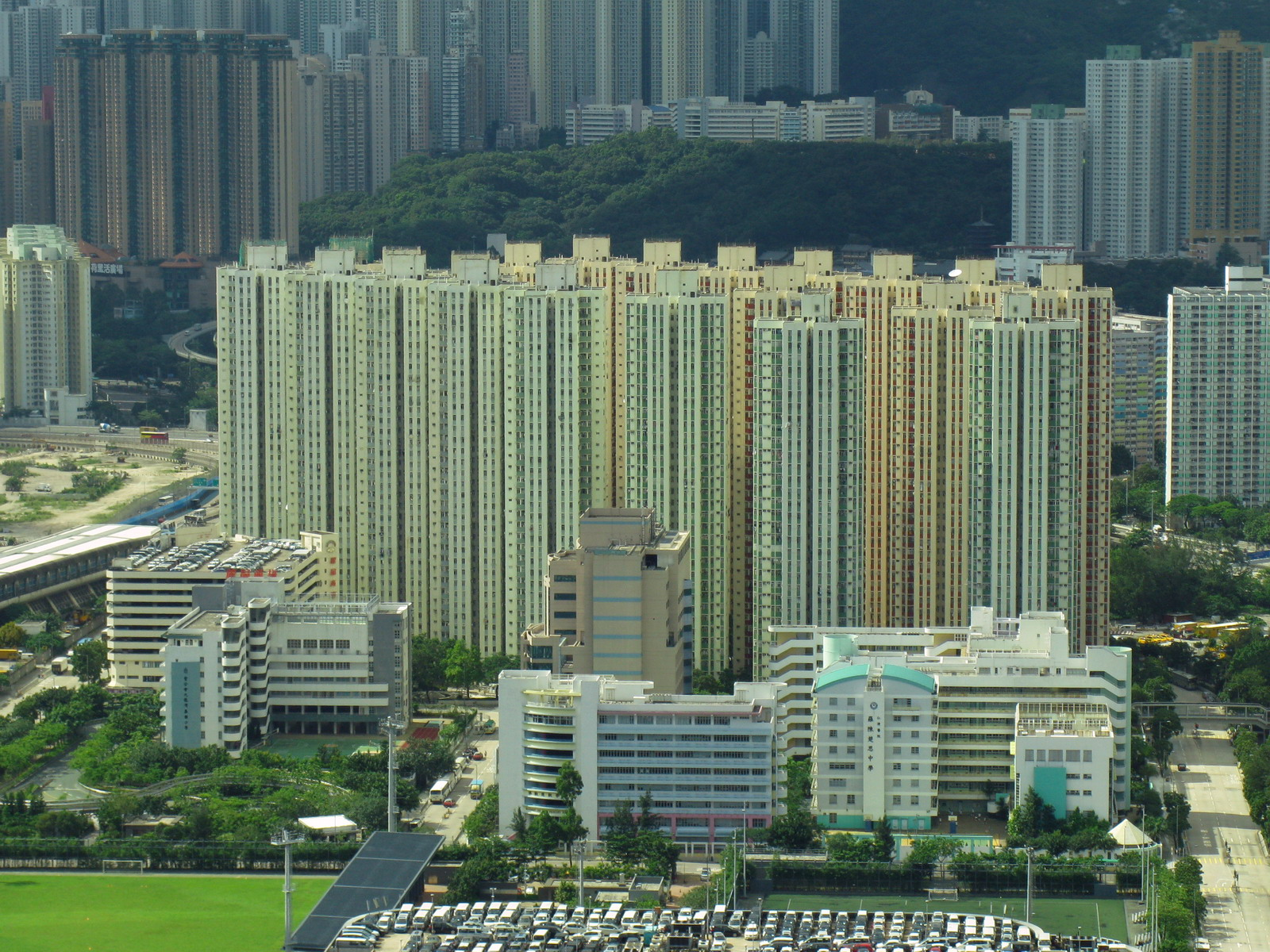
Richland Gardens

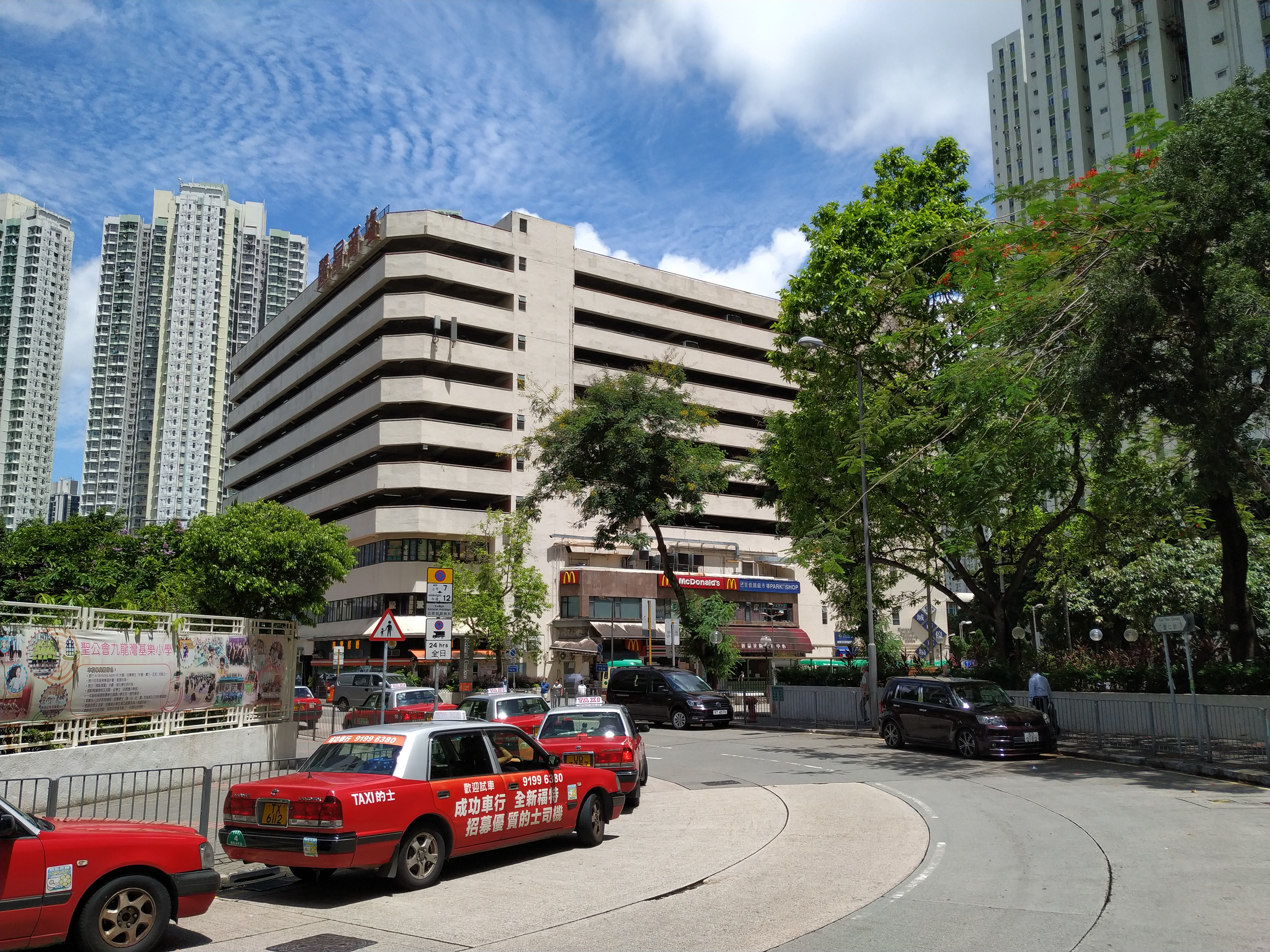
Richland Gardens Shopping Centre

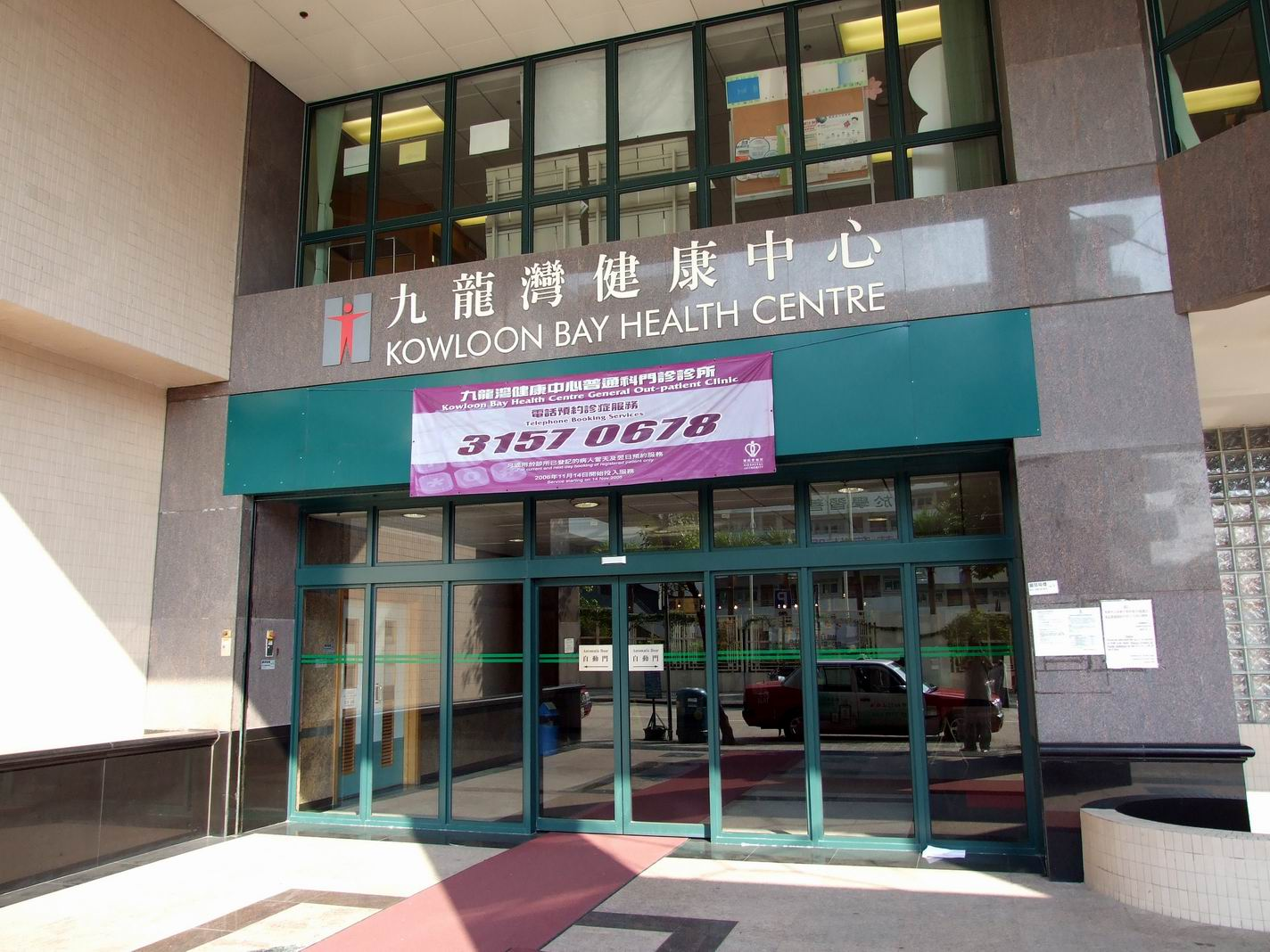
Kowloon Bay Health Centre

Richland Gardens (Chinese: 麗晶花園) is a home ownership scheme and Private Sector Participation Scheme in Kowloon Bay, Kowloon, Hong Kong, near the Kai Yip Estate. It was jointly developed by the Hong Kong Housing Authority and Shui On Land Limited. It consists of 22 residential blocks and a shopping centre completed in 1985. It was built next to Kai Tak and is one of the closest buildings to the former airport.

== Kowloon Bay Health Centre Incident ==
In 1995, the government proposed the construction of a clinic which included a treatment centre for HIV/AIDS infection. The Richland Gardens residents were worried about bringing undesirable people and infectious disease to the area, and strongly protested against the plan. Although the centre could still open in 1999, the residents continued to protest against the centre, by blocking access to the clinic, annoying and attacking patients and health care workers. Several residents were then sued by the Equal Opportunities Commission, but finally the case was settled out of court in 2001.

== Transport ==
A monorail station has been proposed for Richland Gardens as part of the Environmentally Friendly Linkage System (EFLS) (also known as the Kai Tak monorail).

== Education ==
Richland Gardens is in Primary One Admission (POA) School Net 46. Within the school net are multiple aided schools (operated independently but funded with government money); no government primary schools are in this net.
