= Cross Bay Link =

Bridge in Tseung Kwan O, Hong Kong

Cross Bay Link 將軍澳跨灣連接路
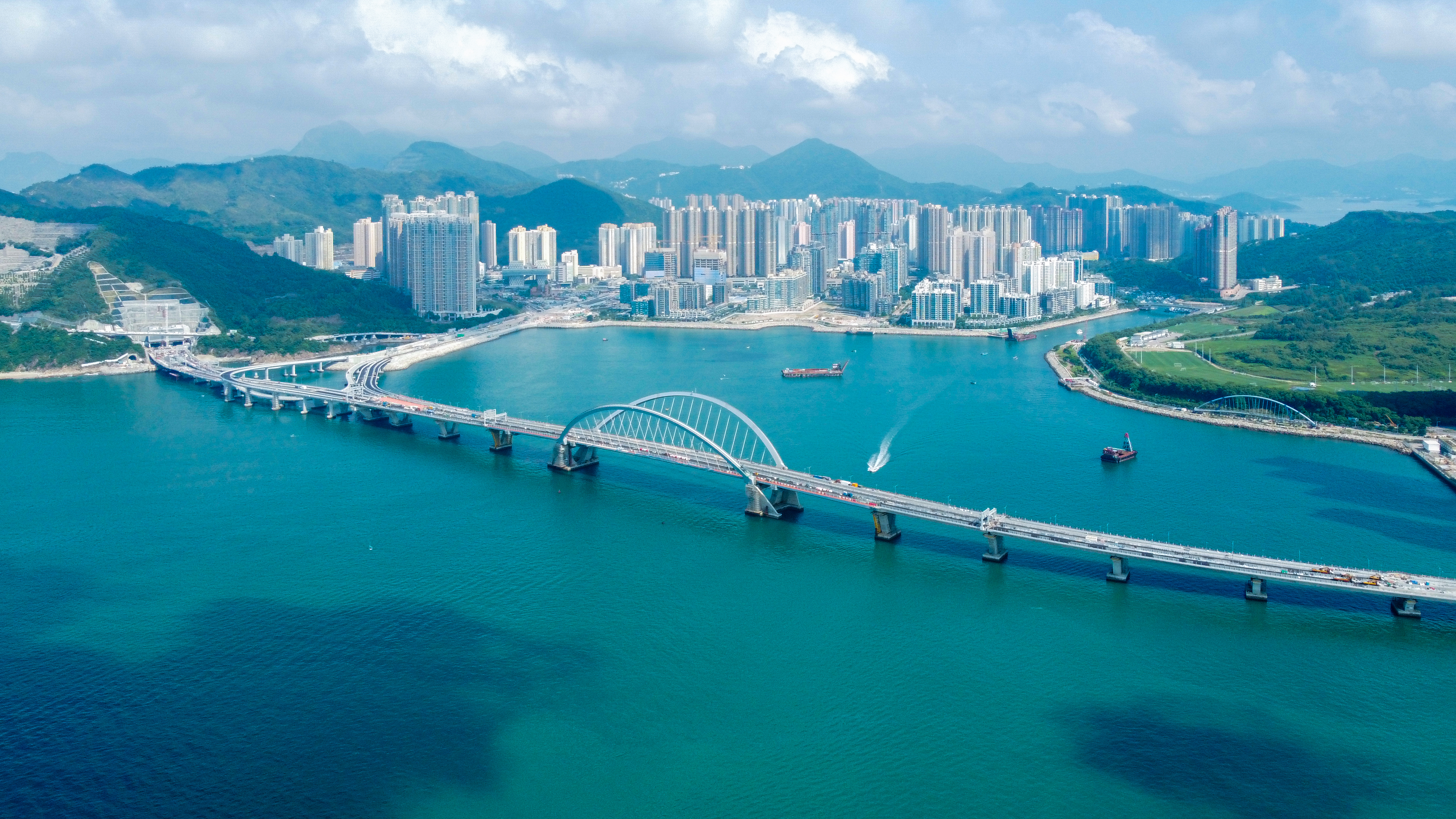
- The site of the bridge link in October 2022.
- Coordinates: 22°17′38.08″N 114°15′34.98″E
- Carries: Vehicles, pedestrians, bicycles
- Crosses: Junk Bay
- Locale: Tseung Kwan O New Town, Hong Kong

Characteristics
- Design: Arch bridge
- Total length: 1,800 m (5,900 ft)
- Longest span: 200 m (660 ft)
- Clearance below: 17 m (56 ft)

History
- Construction start: 2018; 8 years ago
- Opened: 11 December 2022; 3 years ago

Statistics
- Toll: Free of charge

Location
- Interactive map of Cross Bay Link

The Cross Bay Link (Chinese: 將軍澳跨灣連接路) is a 1.8 km (1.1 mi) dual two-lane carriageway connecting the Tseung Kwan O Industrial Estate and LOHAS Park areas in Tseung Kwan O New Town, New Territories, Hong Kong with Tseung Kwan O-Lam Tin Tunnel.

The mainstay of the link is the 1.0 km (0.62 mi) Tseung Kwan O Cross Bay Bridge (Chinese: 將軍澳跨灣大橋), a marine viaduct spanning Junk Bay incorporating a 200 m (660 ft) double-arch steel bridge. It is the first marine crossing in Hong Kong that combines the functions of carriageway, footway and cycle track in one bridge. The rest of the link is the bridge's at-grade approach named Wan O Road (Chinese: 環澳路) south of LOHAS Park.

== Description ==
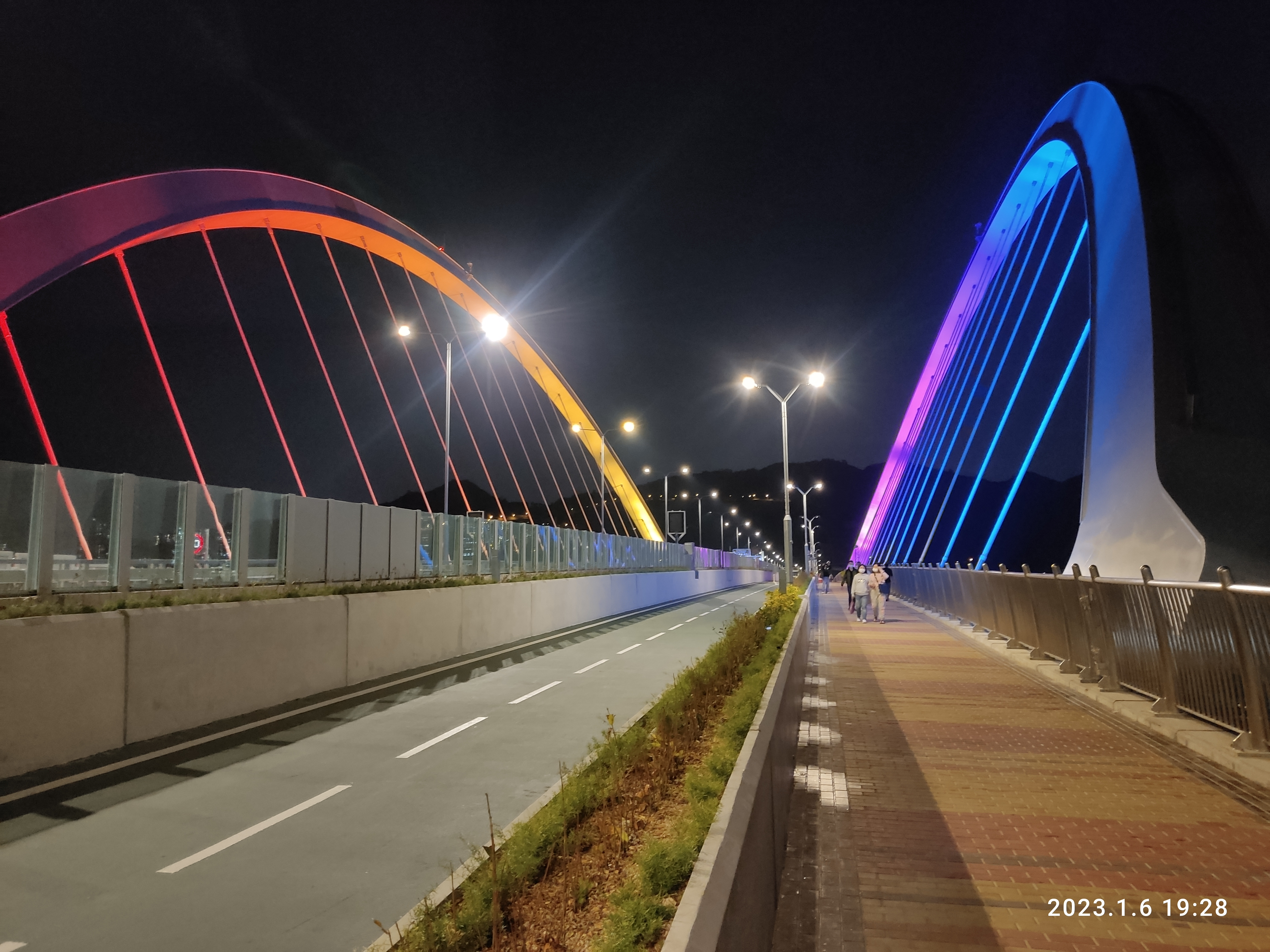
The Cross Bay Bridge is the first marine viaduct in Hong Kong boasting a cycle track. The landmark double arches are seen illuminated in the background.

The Tseung Kwan O Cross Bay Bridge links up the Tseung Kwan O Interchange, where it connects to the Tseung Kwan O–Lam Tin Tunnel (TKOLTT), with Wan O Road outside LOHAS Park. At the western end of the bridge, vehicle may enter or leave the bridge either through the TKOLTT, or via the spur route of Tseung Lam Highway (of which the bridge is part of) connecting to Tiu Keng Leng and Tseung Kwan O Town Centre. At its eastern end, the bridge continues as the at-grade Wan O Road (codenamed Road D9 during its construction), which intersects with the north-south artery Wan Po Road linking to Tseung Kwan O Industrial Estate. Unlike TKOLTT, the bridge is not part of Route 6.

The centrepiece of the bridge is the prefabricated double-arch steel bridge section in its middle. With a length of 200 m and a weight of 10,000 tonnes, the main span is the longest and heaviest steel arch bridge in Hong Kong. The main span has a maximum clearance of 160 m (520 ft) in width by 17 m (56 ft) in height. The remaining sections of the bridge are concrete bridges with concrete box girders.

The design concept "Eternity Arch" was adopted for the main span. The two outward leaning arches, which resemble the infinity symbol (∞), is said to signify the vitality, boundless energy and vigour found in the vibrant town of Tseung Kwan O. The arches are illuminated by LED spotlights from 7pm to 9pm every evening.

The bridge's deck, 34 m (112 ft) in width, carries (from north to south) a footpath, a cycle track, and the eastbound and westbound carriageways, with green strips separating each of them. Three observation platforms are also built along the footpath for pedestrians to appreciate the scenery of Tseung Kwan O. It is the first time that a cycle track is provided on a marine viaduct in Hong Kong, and with the bridge's completion, a 5 km (3.1 mi) loop cycleway encircling Junk Bay is formed. While the bridge is designed to withstand typhoons with wind speeds up to 320 km per hour, pedestrians and cyclists would be barred from accessing the bridge when the wind speed reaches 40 km/h.

== History ==
On 16 March 2009, Ove Arup & Partners Hong Kong Limited was employed to undertake the investigation and preliminary design of Cross Bay Link.

The "My vision of the Cross Bay Link Design Ideas Invitation" event was held in August 2009 and the winning entry was selected on 9 November 2009. In March 2010, six bridge design options collected have been developed for detailed evaluation.

On 6 July 2010, after detailed analysis of public engagement results and technical assessments, the Eternity Arch was selected as the preferred option for Cross Bay Link to the next phase of design works. AECOM was employed to carry out the detailed design and supervise the construction.

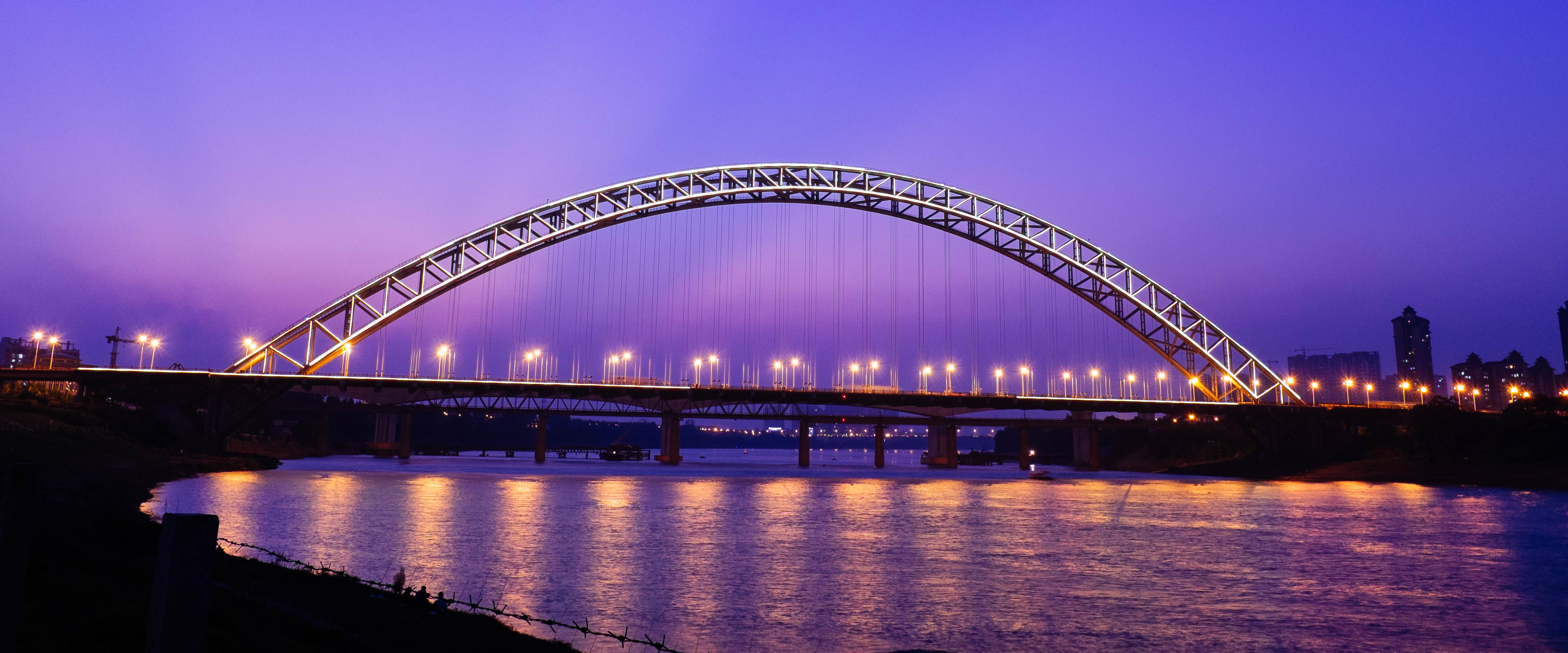
Yonghe Bridge in Nanning, Guangxi

Responding to public opinion that the bridge's design was similar to the Yonghe Bridge in Nanning, Guangxi, district councillor Gary Fan believed it is not a direct copy. Civil Engineering and Development Department chief engineer Wong Wai Man claimed that there are thousands of bridges in the world that are over 200 m (220 yd) long, and as such, there was no way the designers could go through all of them to make sure the CBL was not similar to another bridge in design.

In 2018, the HK$2.5 billion contract to construct the bridge was awarded to China Road and Bridge Corporation. Meinhardt Infrastructure & Environment Ltd. and Hewson Consulting were appointed as the designers for China Road and Bridge Corporation to provide alternative permanent works design, erection engineering and temporary works design for the bridgeworks. The steel bridge components, including the main span, were prefabricated in Nantong, China before being delivered progressively to Hong Kong by sea. The main span was carried by a semi-submersible barge, and arrived at the works site on 16 February 2021 after an 8-day voyage.

Construction progress of the Tseung Kwan O Cross Bay Bridge

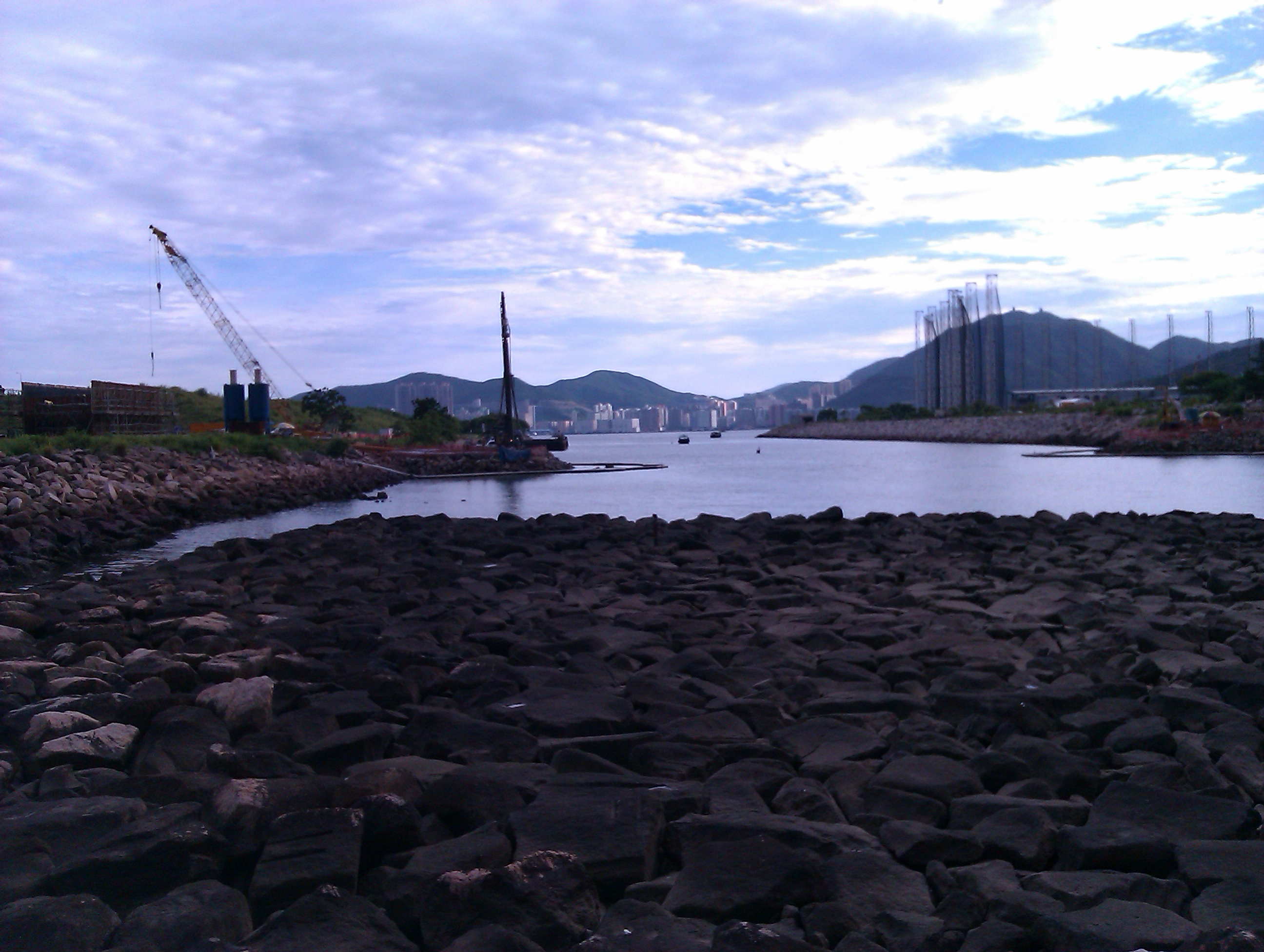
Preliminary works (2010)

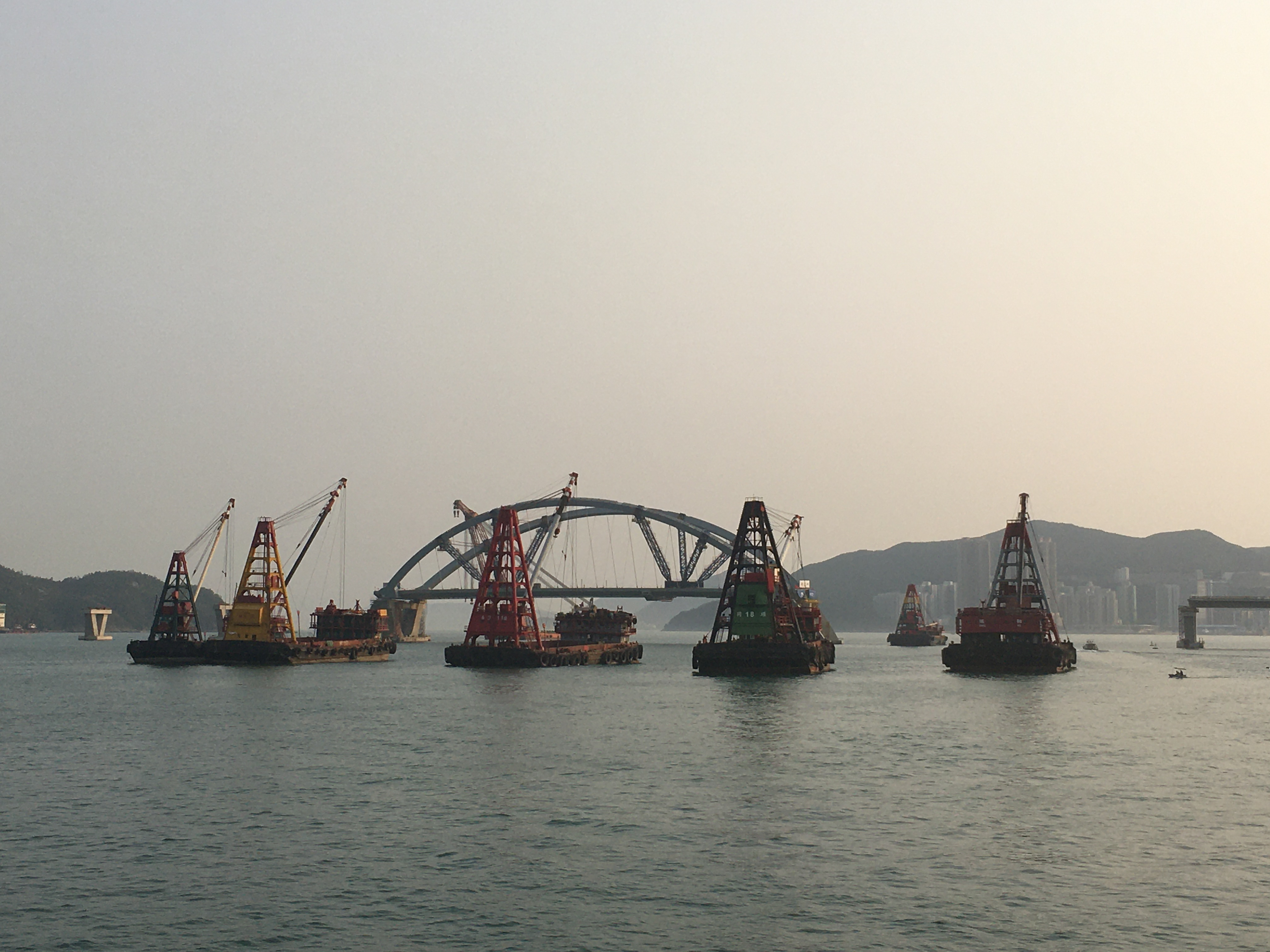
March 2021

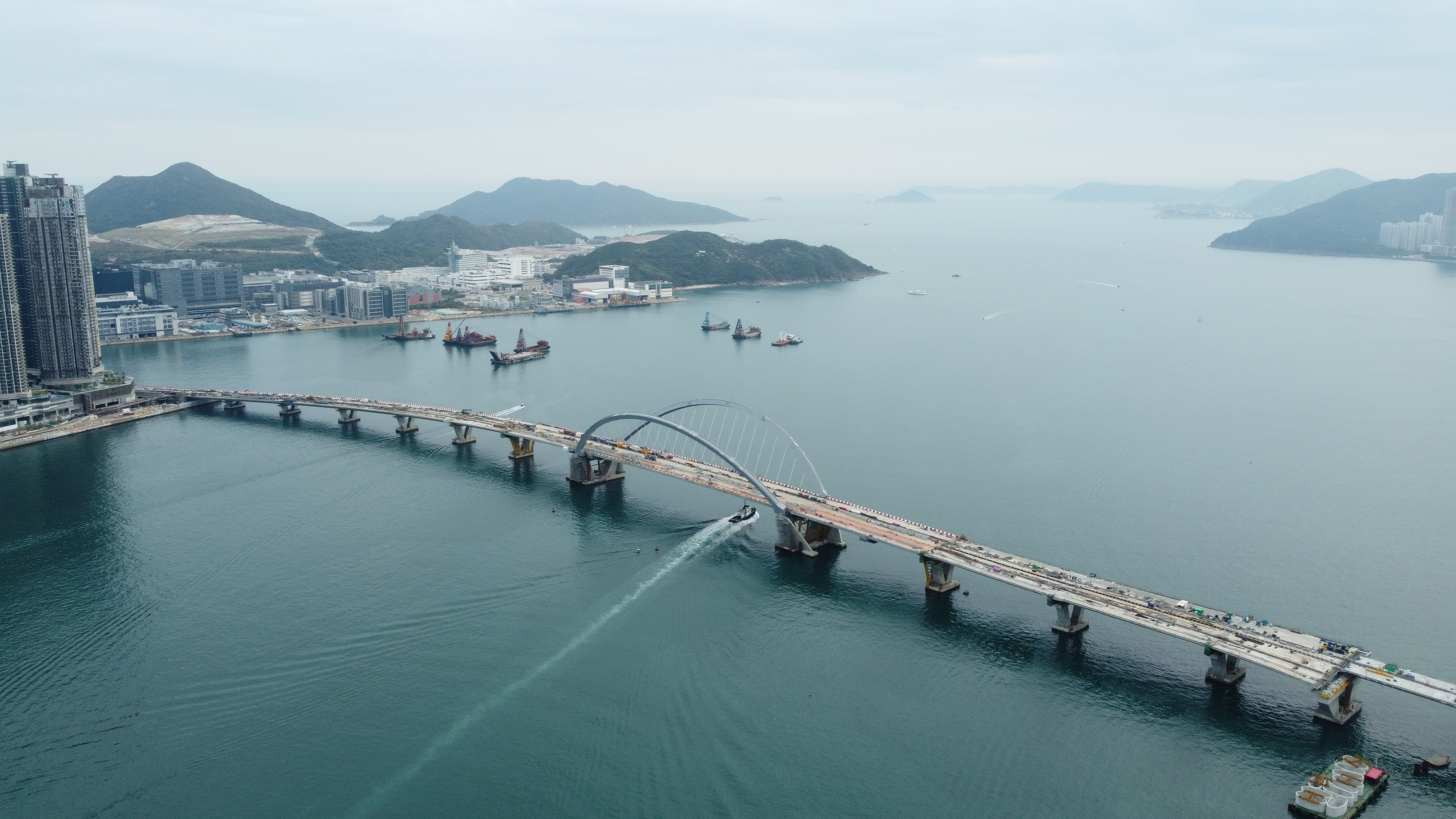
January 2022

Along with the Tseung Kwan O-Lam Tin Tunnel, the Cross Bay Link opened to traffic at 8am on 11 December 2022. The two new roads were expected to reduce the travelling time between LOHAS Park and Kwun Tong Town Centre by 20 minutes during the morning peak hours.

== See also ==
- List of tunnels and bridges in Hong Kong
