= Kai Tak Development =

Redevelopment of Kai Tak Airport, Hong Kong

Kai Tak Development 啟德發展計劃
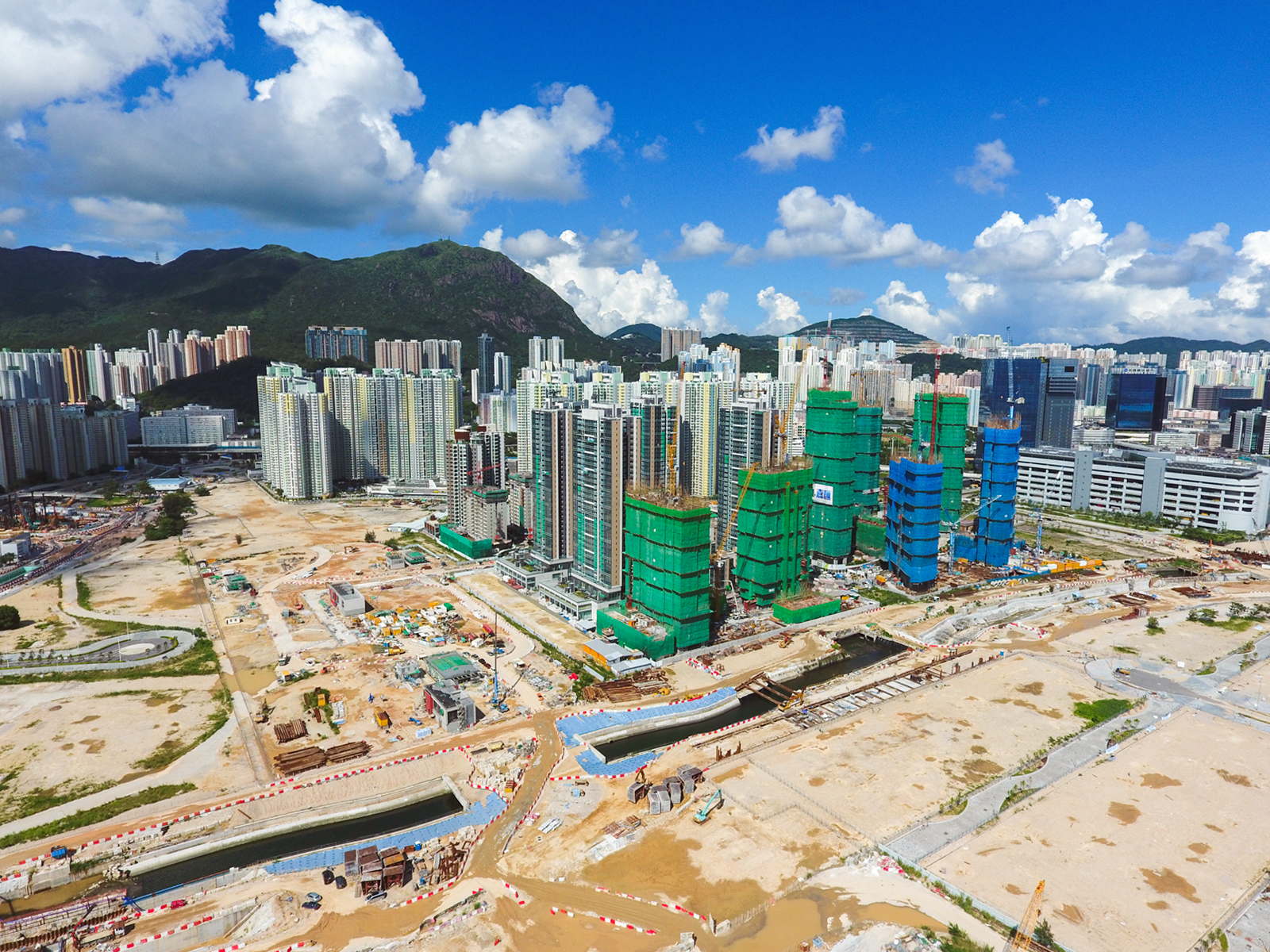
- The Kai Tak Development site in July 2017.

- Location within Hong Kong
- Coordinates: 22.3272°N 114.1978°E

Area
  - Total: 320 ha (790 acres)
- Website: ktd.gov.hk

Kai Tak Development
- Traditional Chinese: 啟德發展計劃
- Simplified Chinese: 启德发展计划
Transcriptions
Standard Mandarin
- Hanyu Pinyin: Qǐdé Fāzhǎn Jìhuà
Yue: Cantonese
- Jyutping: kai2 dak1 faat3 zin2 gai3 waak6

South East Kowloon Development
- Traditional Chinese: 東南九龍發展計劃
- Simplified Chinese: 东南九龙发展计划
Transcriptions
Standard Mandarin
- Hanyu Pinyin: Dōngnán Jiǔlóng Fāzhǎn Jìhuà
Yue: Cantonese
- Jyutping: dung1 naam4 gau2 lung4 faat3 zin2 gai3 waak6

The Kai Tak Development (Chinese: 啟德發展計劃), abbreviated as "KTD" and formerly called South East Kowloon Development (東南九龍發展計劃), refers to the redevelopment of the former Kai Tak Airport site in Kai Tak, Kowloon, Hong Kong.

After the airport relocated to Chek Lap Kok in 1998, the Hong Kong Government planned for urban development on the old airport site. The plan calls for a multi-purpose sports complex, a metro park, the Kai Tak Cruise Terminal, a hotel, a housing estate, and commercial and entertainment construction projects over an area of more than 328 hectares (810 acres). The plan also covered nearby development in areas including Ma Tau Wai, Kowloon City, San Po Kong, Kowloon Bay and Kwun Tong.

The planned population is 86,000 people, accommodated in 30,000 housing units, including 13,000 constructed as part of public housing estates. The total gross floor area is over 14,400,000 square feet (1,340,000 m^{2}) with over 110 hectares (270 acres) of open space. The total cost for the development is about HK$100 billion.

After several years of planning and discussion, and the decision of a judicial review on Central and Wan Chai Reclamation, the Hong Kong government restarted KTD review and planning in 2004. The Executive Council passed the revised development plan and restarted the project. According to the development plan, the first stage projects were to be finished in or before 2013. The second stage projects were to be finished in or before 2016, and the final stage projects were to be completed in or before 2025.

== History ==
=== 1980s ===
Layout of Kai Tak Airport prior to its 1998 closure

The Hong Kong colonial government commissioned the "Study on Harbour Reclamations and Urban Growth" (海港填海及市區發展研究) in October 1983. It was a study for a proposed plan to address the urban development of Hong Kong. The government worked on the "Metroplan Selected Strategy" study (都會計劃選定策略研究) between 1987 and 1990. Its purpose was to provide a wide-ranging plan for urban renewal-focused land-use, transport and environmental planning. The studied areas included West Kowloon, Kai Tak and other regions. The study was passed by the Executive Council on 17 September 1991. Afterwards, related government departments implemented the strategy according to the study.

=== 1990s ===
In 1998, the Planning Department undertook several studies on East Kowloon development. After several modifications, the land reclamation plan and the population plan were altered considerably.

==== South East Kowloon Development Statement (June 1992-1993) (Note: Chinese: 東南九龍發展綱領研究) ====
This plan proposed the development of Kai Tak as a "City Within a City", covering 580 hectares (1,400 acres), including 300 hectares (740 acres) of reclaimed land. It proposed land development for residential, commercial and industrial use. The designated population of this new town was around 285,000. The development would also include a 7.9-hectare (20-acre) park and a 2.7-kilometre (1.7 mi) promenade. The proposed development included two MTR connections, with Diamond Hill and Kwun Tong.

==== Feasibility Study for South East Kowloon Development (September 1995-1998) (Note: Chinese: 東南九龍發展可行性研究) ====
The study refocused the development as a "City Within a City" with territorial facilities. The site area and reclamation provisions remained the same as in the previous proposal. However, the designated population rose to 320,000 while the metropark was expanded to 50 hectares (120 acres). It was also the first plan to propose leisure facilities, such as a multi-purpose sports complex and aviation museum. Other facilities, including a hospital, rail yard, and post office were proposed. The MTR provisions were replaced by the Sha Tin to Central Link.

=== 2000s ===
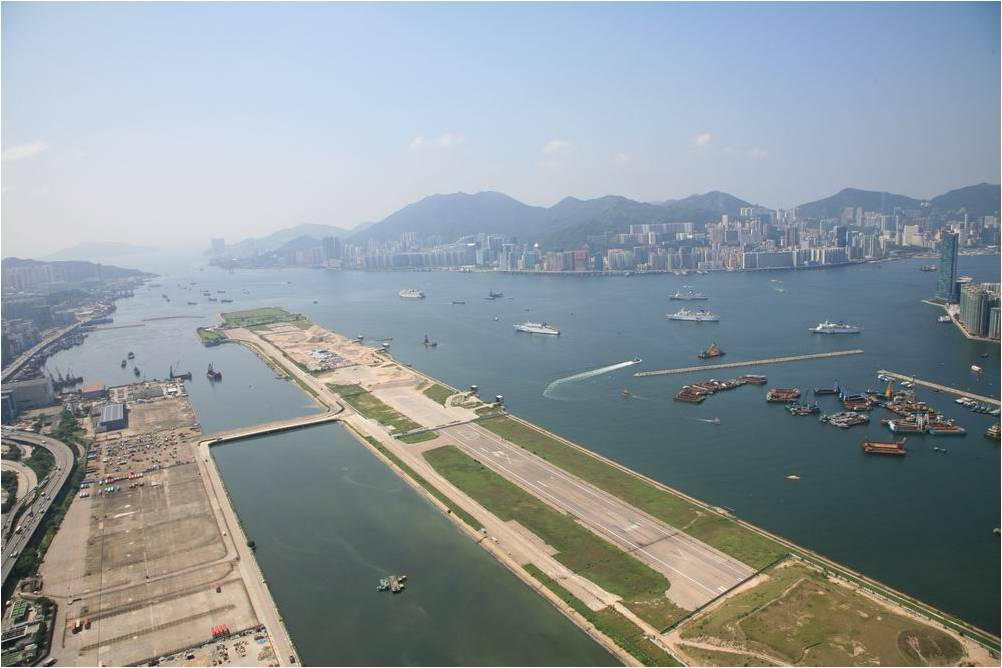
Part of the KTD area in 2009

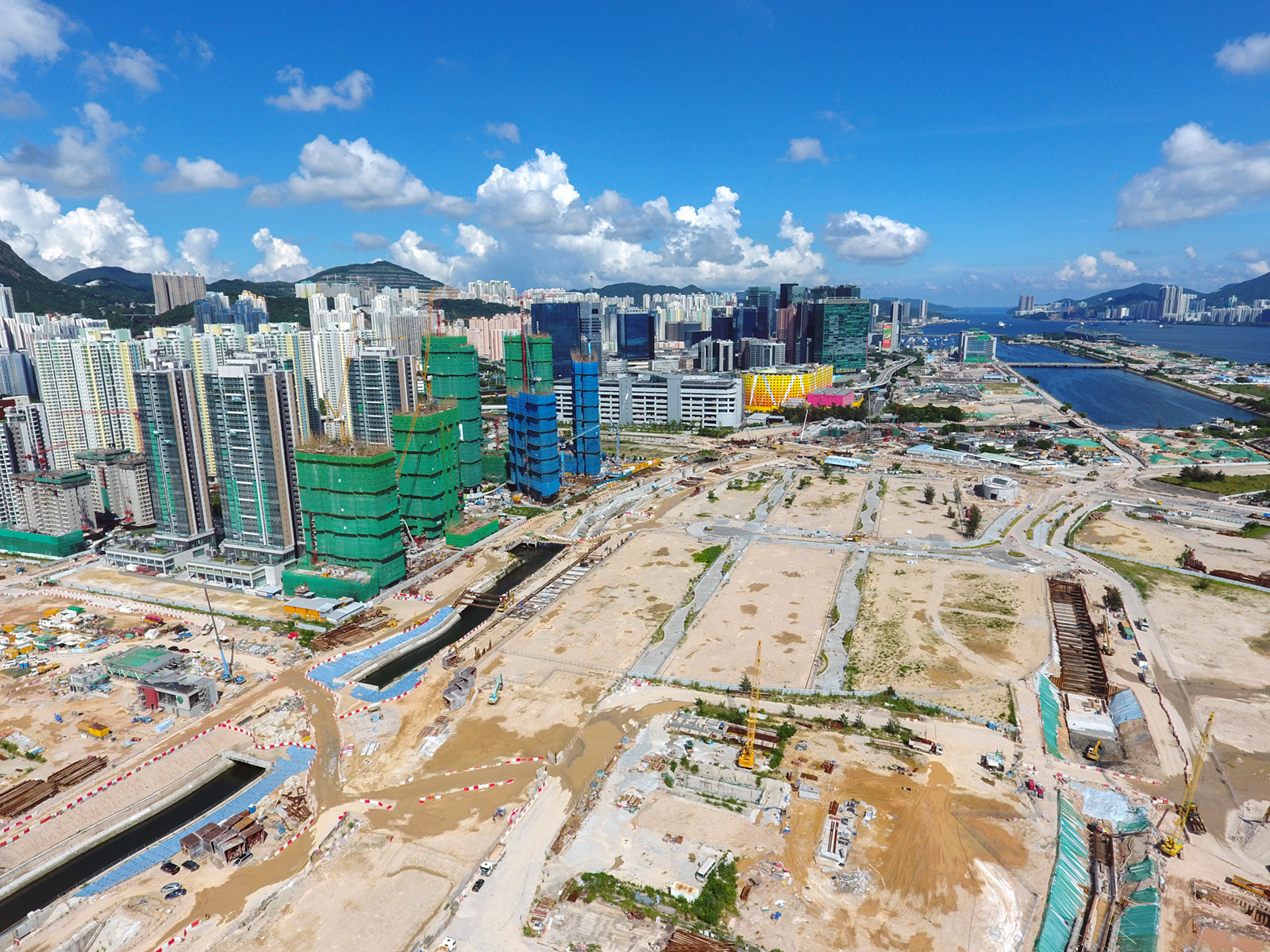
Part of the KTD area in 2017

==== Comprehensive Feasibility Study for the Revised Scheme of South East Kowloon Development (November 1999-2003) (Note: Chinese: 東南九龍發展修訂計劃的整體可行性研究) ====
The study re-designated the Kai Tak Development as an "Environmentally Friendly City". In response to opinions on land reclamation, the authority reduced the reclamation area to 133 hectares (330 acres) while the overall site area declined to 460 hectares (1,100 acres). The new designated population is 26,0000. The metropark was to shrink to 24 hectares (59 acres) but the promenade would be extended to 5.4 kilometres (3.4 mi). It also first proposed a cruise terminal. The MTR-centric strategy continued in the study, with the new Environmentally Friendly Linkage System proposal.

In June 2002, the Executive Council of Hong Kong approved Outline Zoning Plans (S/K19/3 and S/K21/3) for Kai Tak (North) and Kai Tak (South). Major development projects included the MTR Sha Tin to Central Link depot on the original airport site, a multi-use stadium, a metro park, the Kai Tak Cruise Terminal with helicopter landing site at the end of former runway, and the Central Kowloon Route. A new road: Trunk Road T2, paralleling the Kwun Tong Bypass, will be built within the development area, allowing traffic to go directly to Tseung Kwan O through the Tseung Kwan O - Lam Tin Tunnel.

However, on 27 February 2003, the non-government organisation Society for Protection of the Harbour applied for Judicial Review against the Town Planning Board. The Society believed that the Wan Chai Development Phase II would violate the Protection of the Harbour Ordinance. The High Court's final judgement is against the Town Planning Board. The reclamation plan was suspended. The High Court's judgement raised three tests had to be satisfied for reclamation:

1. there had to be a compelling, overriding and present public need which clearly outweighed the public need to protect the harbour;
2. there had to be no other alternative to implement the undertaking for which it was proposed, and
3. that any invasion of the harbour should be restricted to the minimum impairment necessary to implement the undertaking.

This judgement affected the reclamation plan within Kai Tak Development. In order to satisfy the three tests, the new Harbour-front Enhancement Committee was established for consultation on the reclamation in Wan Chai and Kai Tak. The committee, led by chairman Lee Chack-fan, was organised by six government officials and twenty-three members from different professional organisations, environmental organisations, harbour protection organisations and business merchants.

==== Kai Tak Planning Review (July 2004-2006) (Note: Chinese: 啟德規劃檢討) ====
Due to the High Court judgement, the Planning Department began the Kai Tak Planning Review with "no reclamation" as its principle. This was the final plan.

== Proposed development timeline ==
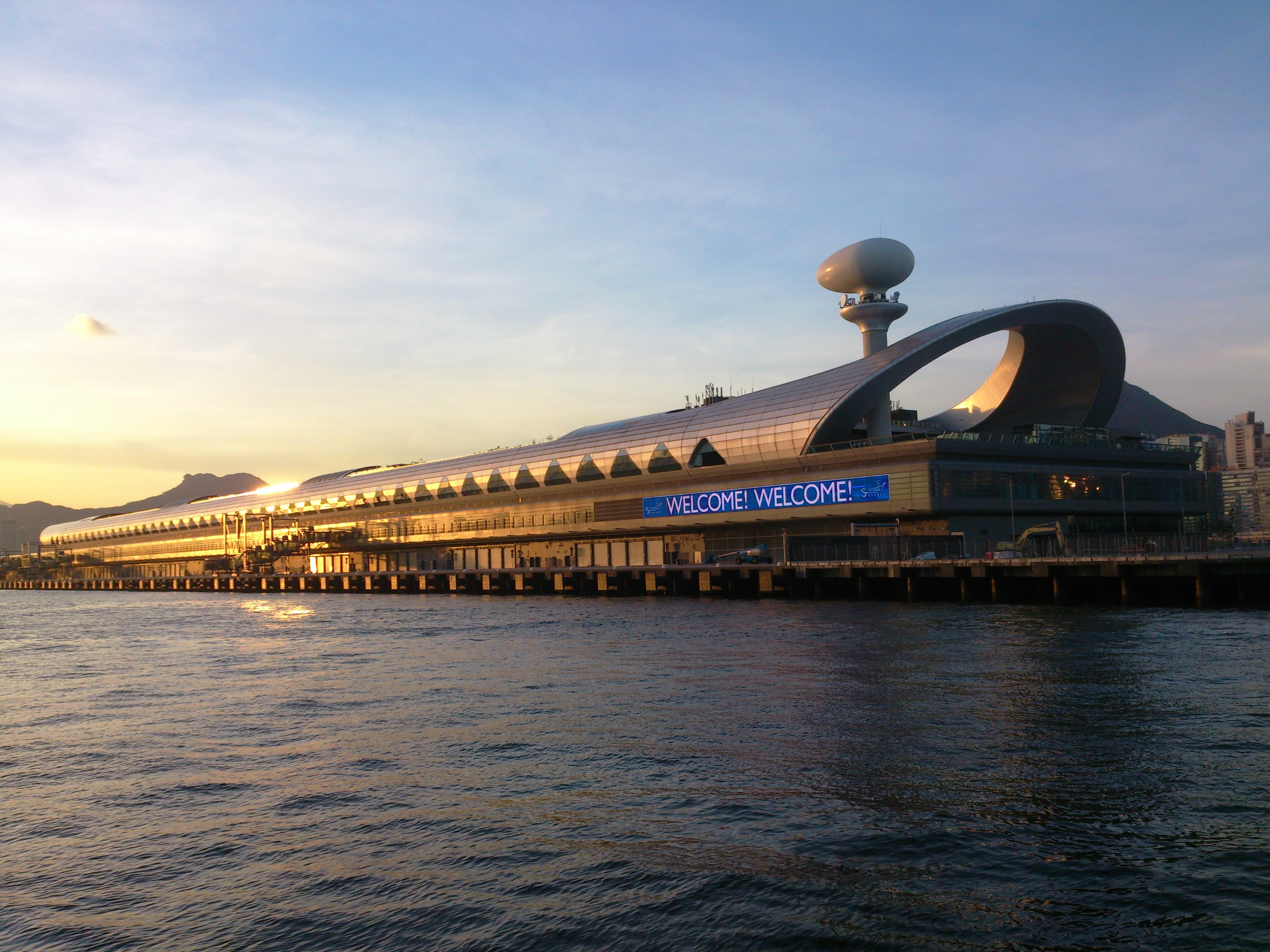
Kai Tak Cruise Terminal.

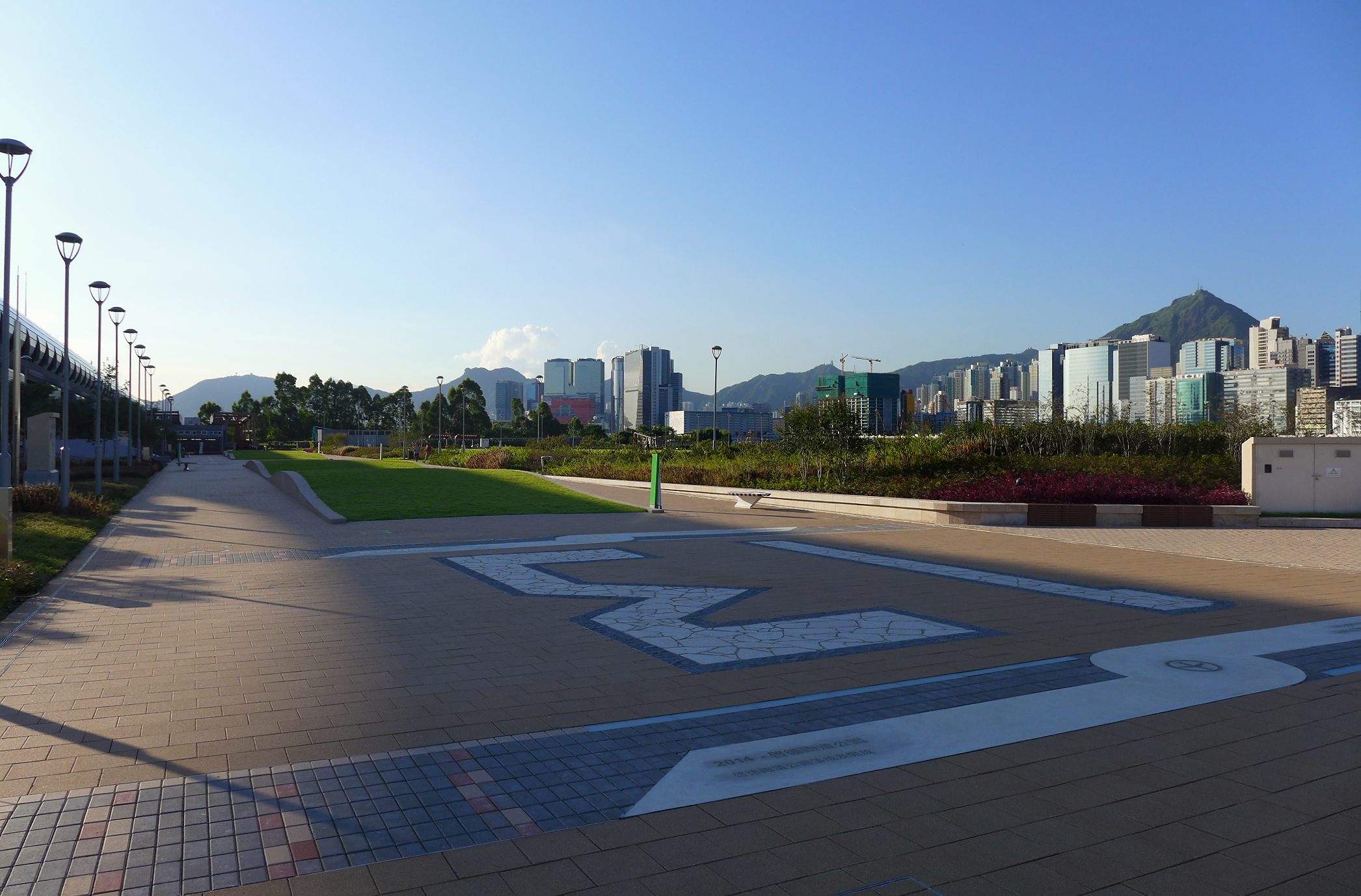
Kai Tak Runway Park with its former runway number: 13

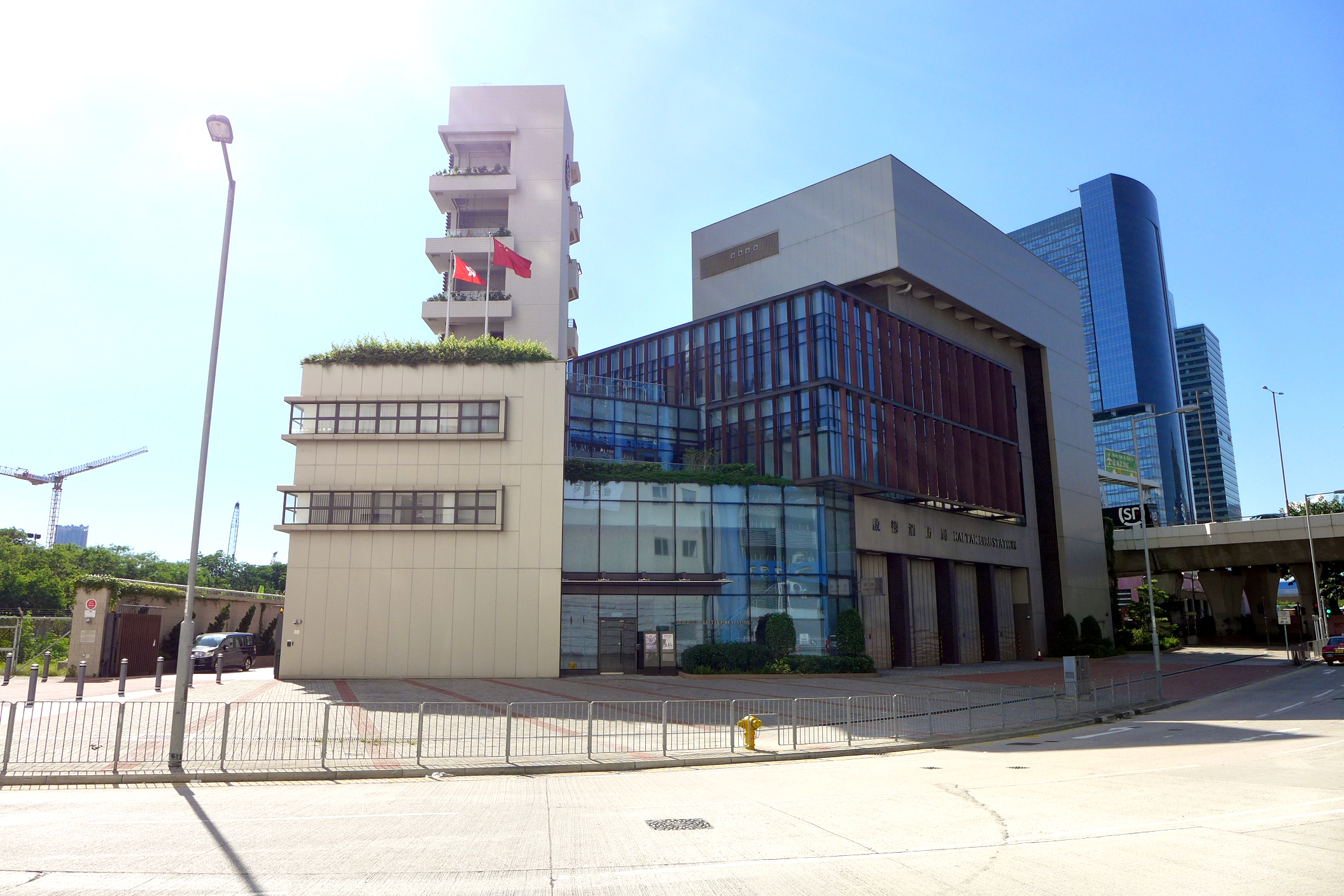
Kai Tak Fire Station

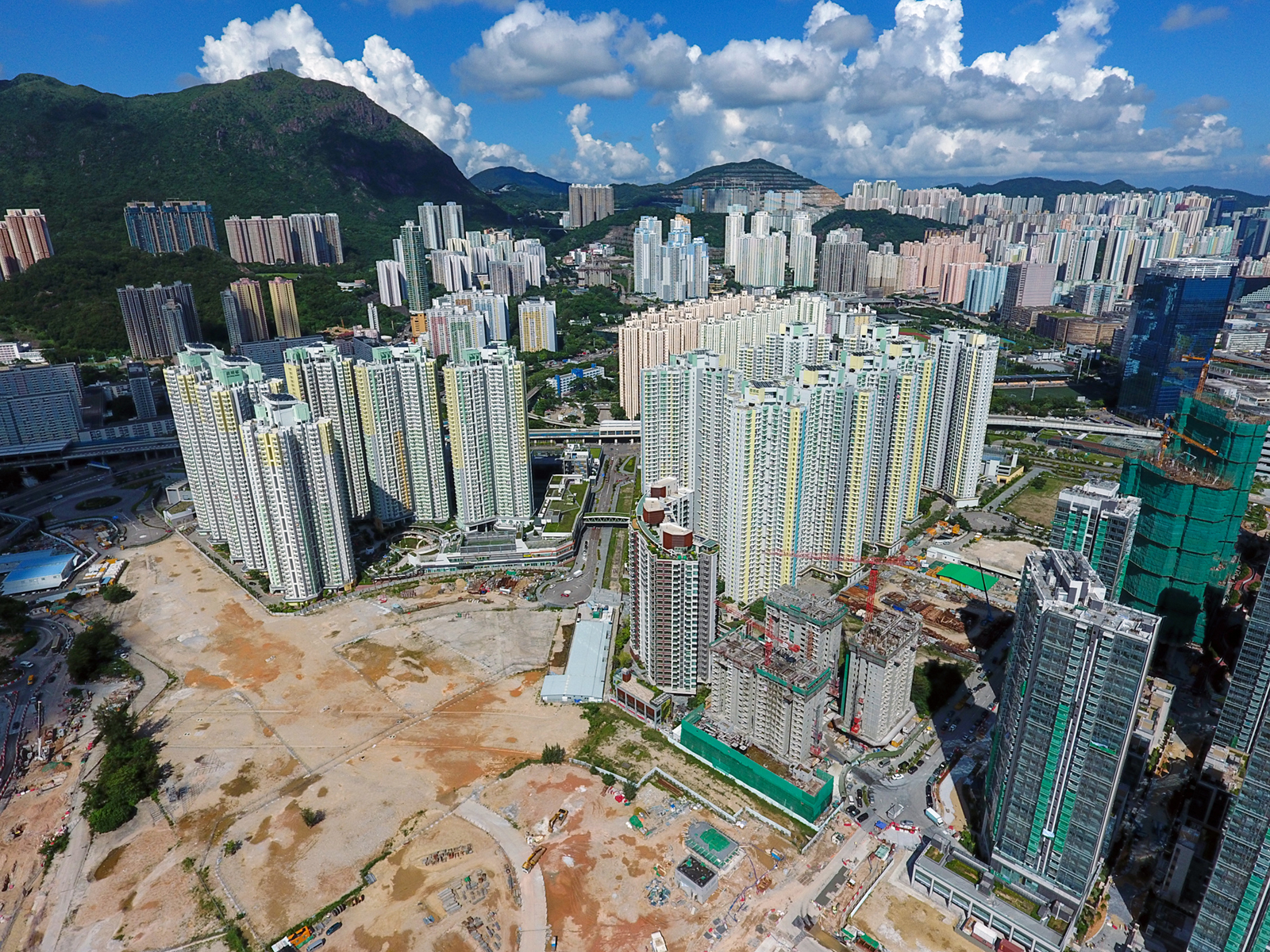
Kai Ching Estate and Tak Long Estate

The first stage infrastructure projects are mostly completed and open. These are the first stage projects:

- Trade and Industry Tower (completed in 2015)
- Kai Tak Fire Station (completed)
- Kai Tak Cruise Terminal building and first berth (completed)
- Kwun Tong Promenade (completed)
- Kai Tak Runway Park (completed)
- District Cooling System (first phase) (completed)
- Kai Ching Estate
- Tak Long Estate

The second stage infrastructure projects were expected to completed after 2016. These are the second stage projects:

- Kai Tak Cruise Terminal: second berth, helicopter landing zone and Tourist Centre (complete September 2014)
- MTR Tuen Ma line Kai Tak station (construction began 2012, completed in 2020)
- Route 6 (Central Kowloon Route and Trunk Road T2) (under construction)
- Underground street to Kowloon City and San Po Kong
- Kai Tak River (Finished)
- District Cooling System (second phase)
- Hospital: Hong Kong Children's Hospital (construction began in 2014, completed in 2017) and Centre of Excellence in Neuroscience
- Kai Tak Sky Garden, a massive elevated garden, opened in May 2021. It occupies part of the former runway and apron.
- Several private residential developments including:
  - Oasis Kai Tak
  - One Kai Tak
  - Vibe Centro
  - Victoria Skye

The final stage infrastructure projects are expected to completed after 2024. These are the final stage projects:

- Kai Tak Sports Park (expected to be completed by 2025)
- Environmentally Friendly Linkage System (EFLS) (Put on hold)
- Metro Park
- Remaining residential and commercial land at north apron
- commercial land at south apron
- District Cooling System (third phase)

== Transport ==
=== MTR Tuen Ma line ===
The Tuen Ma line involves construction of two stations within the KTD: Kai Tak station and Sung Wong Toi station.

=== Environmentally Friendly Linkage System ===
The Environmentally Friendly Linkage System (EFLS) is a monorail transportation system with 12 stations proposed by the government. It will cost around 1.2 billion Hong Kong dollars. The estimated passenger count is up to 200,000 in 2031. The system will account for 15 percent of the public transportation in the Kowloon East Development. The EFLS project is now headed by the Development Bureau with public consultation carried out by the Civil Engineering and Development Department. Construction was predicted to start in 2018 and to be completed in 2023, but was put on hold indefinitely.

There is opposition to the monorail system and other proposing a tram system (using ground-level power supply) as a more feasible alternative.

=== Highway and roads ===
Hong Kong's Route 6 is proposed to cross the KTD area, using the Central Kowloon Route, Trunk Road T2 and Tseung Kwan O–Lam Tin Tunnel. It will connect West Kowloon, Kowloon East and Tseung Kwan O.

== See also ==
- Architecture of Hong Kong
- Civil Engineering and Development Department
- Kai Tak Airport
- RAF Kai Tak
