= Round-the-Island Trail Hong Kong =

Planned 60 km walking trail round Hong Kong Island

Hong Kong Island (green), showing the coastline the planned Round-the-Island Trail proposes to connect.

The Round-the-Island Trail is a planned approximately 60-kilometre walking route encircling Hong Kong Island by linking existing harbourfront promenades and countryside trails, announced by the Hong Kong Government in the 2022 Policy Address and now under phased development.

== Overview ==
The Round-the-Island Trail is a long-distance recreational trail intended to provide a largely continuous walking experience around the coastline of Hong Kong Island. It connects waterfront promenades along the island's northern shore with existing promenades and countryside walking paths in the Southern District, creating a single, island-encircling route.

== History ==
The trail was first formally announced in the 2022 Policy Address by Chief Executive John Lee Ka-chiu as part of new leisure facilities and projects aimed at improving livability and expanding public recreational space. The Government began implementing the project in phases in 2023, focusing on closing missing links along the waterfront and upgrading existing sections.

Prior to the government initiative, local non-governmental organizations and district councils had advocated for a Hong Kong Island coastal trail concept. A feasibility study was commissioned by the Civil Engineering and Development Department (CEDD) in May 2023 to examine overall planning, alignment, connection and improvement schemes, and implementation strategy for the Trail.

== Route and sections ==
The Round-the-Island Trail is planned to span about 60 kilometres, running around the entirety of Hong Kong Island. It links harbourfront promenades on the northern shore — including areas such as Kennedy Town, Central and Wan Chai — with promenades and countryside trails in the Southern District, passing beaches, reservoirs and country park hillsides.

For planning and promotion purposes, the Trail is divided into five themed sections: “Sunset Walk,” “Fishery Walk,” “Beach Walk,” “Nature Walk,” and “Harbour Walk.” These sections highlight different landscapes and attractions, from urban harbour views and historical sites to fishing villages, coastal beaches and natural countryside scenery.

== Administration and development ==
The project is led by the Invigorating Island South Office of the Development Bureau, acting as policy bureau, with the Civil Engineering and Development Department as works agent. CEDD's feasibility study, commenced in May 2023, covers alignment options, connection and improvement schemes for various sections, technical assessments, land surveys, implementation strategy and cost estimates.

Implementation is phased, with priority given to closing missing links and improving existing trail segments. Progress updates in 2026 indicate that about 85% of the Trail's length has been connected, with a target of reaching 90% connectivity by around 2027 and substantially completing remaining works by the end of 2031.

== Features and attractions ==
The Round-the-Island Trail is designed to connect urban and natural landscapes, cultural landmarks and historical heritage sites around Hong Kong Island. Planned highlights include modern harbourfront attractions on the north shore, historical structures such as reservoir dams, and well-known hiking segments in country parks.

By integrating promenades, beaches and countryside paths, the Trail aims to offer residents and visitors a variety of leisure activities, from casual waterfront strolls to longer hikes linking multiple themed sections.

== Objectives ==
According to government statements, the Round-the-Island Trail is intended to enhance the city's livability, expand recreational space and diversify leisure options available to the public. The project also aligns with broader harbourfront enhancement efforts by making more of the coastline accessible, continuous and attractive for walking and related activities.
