= Route 6 (Hong Kong) =

Road in Hong Kong

Route 6

- Alignment and exits of Route 6 (zoom in to view exit details)

Route information
- Maintained by Highways Department
- History: Construction started in 2017

Major junctions
- West end: Route 3 near Yau Ma Tei
- Route 5 near Kai Tak; Route 2 near Lam Tin
- East end: Cross Bay Link

Location
- Country: China
- Special administrative region: Hong Kong
- Districts: Yau Tsim Mong, Kowloon City, Kwun Tong, Sai Kung

Highway system
- Transport in Hong Kong; Routes; Roads and Streets
← Route 5	→ Route 7

Route 6 (Chinese: 六號幹綫; Jyutping: luk6 hou6 gon3 sin3) is a partially open trunk route in Hong Kong, planned to be completed in its entirety in 2026. It is the newest trunk route to be numbered under the Strategic Route Number System. The section between Tseung Kwan O and Lam Tin consisting of the new Cross Bay Link and Tseung Kwan O–Lam Tin Tunnel opened to traffic on 11 December 2022, while the Yau Ma Tei Section of the Central Kowloon Bypass opened on 21 December 2025. Its western and eastern termini are at the intersection with Route 3 in West Kowloon and the Tseung Kwan O Interchange of the Cross Bay Link, respectively. Although not officially part of Route 6, the Cross Bay Link carries traffic further to its two eastern terminus, one at Po Shun Road in Tseung Kwan O and the other at Wan O Road in LOHAS Park.

When completed, it will continue from the Lam Tin Interchange through a new unnamed submarine tunnel towards the Kai Tak Development Area, intersecting with Route 5 and connecting with the Central Kowloon Bypass. The Kowloon Bay section of the Central Kowloon Bypass (Trunk Road T2 and Cha Kwo Ling tunnel) is expected to open sometime in mid-2026. It was marked as a high-priority trunk route in the Third Comprehensive Transport Study.

The route significantly relieves the congestion problem in Kowloon, cutting the travel time between Yau Ma Tei and Kowloon Bay from 30 minutes to 5 minutes., while also serving as an alternative route for the existing Tseung Kwan O Tunnel.

== Exits and Junctions ==
Location	Road Name	km	mi	Exit	Yau Ma Tei (West) bound destination	Tseung Kwan O (East) bound destination	Notes
Tseung Kwan O	Tseung Lam Highway	0.0	0.0	1A		Tseung Kwan O Town Centre and Tiu Keng Leng	
Tseung Kwan O	Tseung Lam Highway	0.5 – 2.7	0.3 – 1.7	Tseung Kwan O–Lam Tin Tunnel			
Lam Tin	Tseung Lam Highway	1.4	0.9	1B	Route 2 Eastern Harbour Crossing (southbound) – Hong Kong (East)		
Lam Tin	Tseung Lam Highway	2.8	1.7	2	Cha Kwo Ling Road – Yau Tong and Kwun Tong		
Lam Tin	Tseung Lam Highway	—	—	2		Cha Kwo Ling Road – Hong Kong (East), Yau Tong and Kwun Tong	
Kowloon Bay	Central Kowloon Bypass (Kowloon Bay Section)	—	—	Central Kowloon Bypass (Kowloon Bay Section)			Under construction (2026)
Kowloon Bay	Central Kowloon Bypass (Yau Ma Tei Section)	—	—	3A		Shing Cheong Road – Kai Tak Cruise Terminal, Hong Kong Children's Hospital	
Kowloon Bay	Central Kowloon Bypass (Yau Ma Tei Section)	—	—	3B		Route 5 Kai Fuk Road – Kwun Tong, Hong Kong (East)	
Kowloon Bay	Central Kowloon Bypass (Yau Ma Tei Section)	—	—	3C		Kai Cheung Road, Shing Kai Road – Kowloon Bay, Kai Tak, Kai Tak Sports Park, To Kwa Wan	
Yau Ma Tei	Central Kowloon Bypass (Yau Ma Tei Section)	—	—	4A	Lin Cheung Road (northbound) – Tai Kok Tsui		
Yau Ma Tei	Central Kowloon Bypass (Yau Ma Tei Section)	—	—	4B		Route 3 Western Harbour Crossing – Hong Kong (West)	
Yau Ma Tei	Central Kowloon Bypass (Yau Ma Tei Section)	—	—	4C		Lin Cheung Road (southbound) – Yau Ma Tei	
Yau Ma Tei	Joins Route 3 (West Kowloon Highway) (northbound)						
