= Cycling Association of Hong Kong, China =

National governing body of cycle racing in Hong Kong

HKCA logo

The Cycling Association of Hong Kong, China Limited (in Traditional Chinese: 中國香港單車聯會) or CAHK (formerly the Hong Kong Cycling Association or HKCA) is the national governing body of cycle racing in Hong Kong.

It is a member of the UCI and the Asian Cycling Confederation.

== See also ==
- Hong Kong Cycling Alliance
