= Hong Kong Cycling Alliance =

The Hong Kong Cycling Alliance (HKCAll) (Chinese: 香港單車同盟) is a small non-profit organisation that works to make Hong Kong a more bicycle-friendly city. Through coordination of the efforts of Hong Kong's many cyclists and cycling groups, it campaigns to educate decision-makers about cycling as active transportation, and to encourage and enable all types of cycling, including utility/commuting, leisure riding, off-road, racing and touring.

Founded in 2003, the group focuses on advocacy and engagement with government bodies, transport operators and others to effect changes in laws, regulations, policies and practices that affect the cycling community in Hong Kong, on the roads, on cycle tracks and on public transport. By promoting improved infrastructure and more public education, HKCAll aims to increase the use of bicycles as an efficient, healthy and economical component of Hong Kong's transportation network.

As part of its advocacy programme, HKCAll organises and co-organises events supporting an improved cycling environment, including the first major gathering of cycling groups in November 2005, which demanded government support for cycling, following the road death of a local racing cyclist. Since 2006, the group has coordinated the annual Ride of Silence in memory of cyclists killed and injured on the roads.

In 2003, members of HKCAll were instrumental in negotiations between the Hong Kong Star Ferry Company and the Transport Department leading to the introduction of free carriage of bicycles on the Wanchai-Tsim Sha Tsui Star Ferry route though there is now a small charge of around HK$11. In 2011, after much lobbying, the MTR metro system agreed to allow carriage of bicycles on all its lines.

A popular current campaign calls for the inclusion of a Harbourfront Cycleway along the Hong Kong island shore of Victoria Harbour. The Cycleway runs from Kennedy Town to Heng Fa Chuen, following the harbourfront and new reclamation areas. Regular rallies to cycle the proposed route, as closely as possible, attract over a thousand supporters. In September 2011, HKCAll presented the proposal to the Hong Kong Harbourfront Commission.

== See also ==
- Sustainable transport
- Utility cycling
- Cycleways in Hong Kong
- List of cycleways in Hong Kong
- Segregated cycle facilities
- Vehicular cycling
- Permeability (spatial and transport planning)
- Hong Kong Cycling Association
