= Tseung Kwan O–Lam Tin Tunnel =

Tseung Kwan O–Lam Tin Tunnel 將軍澳－藍田隧道
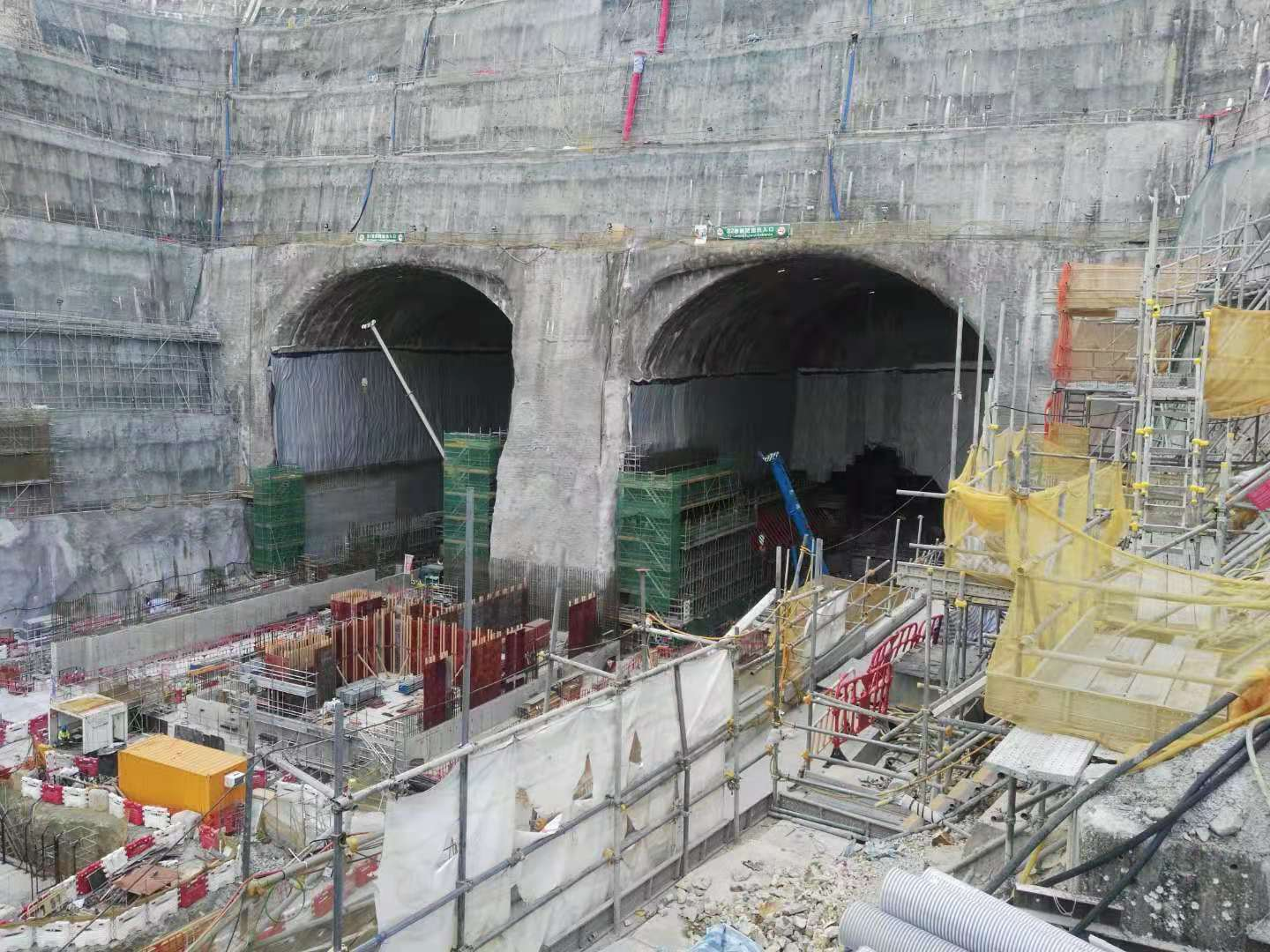
- Tiu Keng Leng portal of Tseung Kwan O - Lam Tin Tunnel
- Interactive map of Tseung Kwan O–Lam Tin Tunnel 將軍澳－藍田隧道

Overview
- Location: Hong Kong
- Status: In service
- Route: Route 6
- Crosses: Chiu Keng Wan Shan
- Start: Tiu Keng Leng
- End: Lam Tin

Operation
- Constructed: 9 December 2016; 9 years ago
- Opened: 11 December 2022; 3 years ago
- Owner: Hong Kong Government
- Operator: Greater Lucky (H.K.) Co., Ltd
- Traffic: Vehicular
- Toll: No

Technical
- Length: 2.2 kilometres (1.4 mi)
- No. of lanes: 4 lanes (2 lanes per direction)
- Operating speed: 80 kilometres per hour (50 mph)

The Tseung Kwan O-Lam Tin Tunnel (traditional Chinese: 將軍澳－藍田隧道; simplified Chinese: 將军澳—蓝田隧道; Cantonese Yale: jeung1 gwan1 ou3 — laahm4 tihn4 seui6 dou6) is a tunnel in Hong Kong that is part of Route 6. Originally expected to open in 2021, its opening was delayed to 11 December 2022 due to the worldwide outbreak of COVID-19.

The tunnel connects Lam Tin to the Tseung Kwan O New Town. The eastern edge of the tunnel project connects directly with the Cross Bay Link to LOHAS Park.

== See also ==
- Cross Bay Link
- Black Hill, Hong Kong
