= History of traffic lights =

Traffic lights are signalling devices positioned at road intersections, pedestrian crossings, and other locations to control flows of traffic. The history of traffic lights is associated with the historic growth of the automobile.

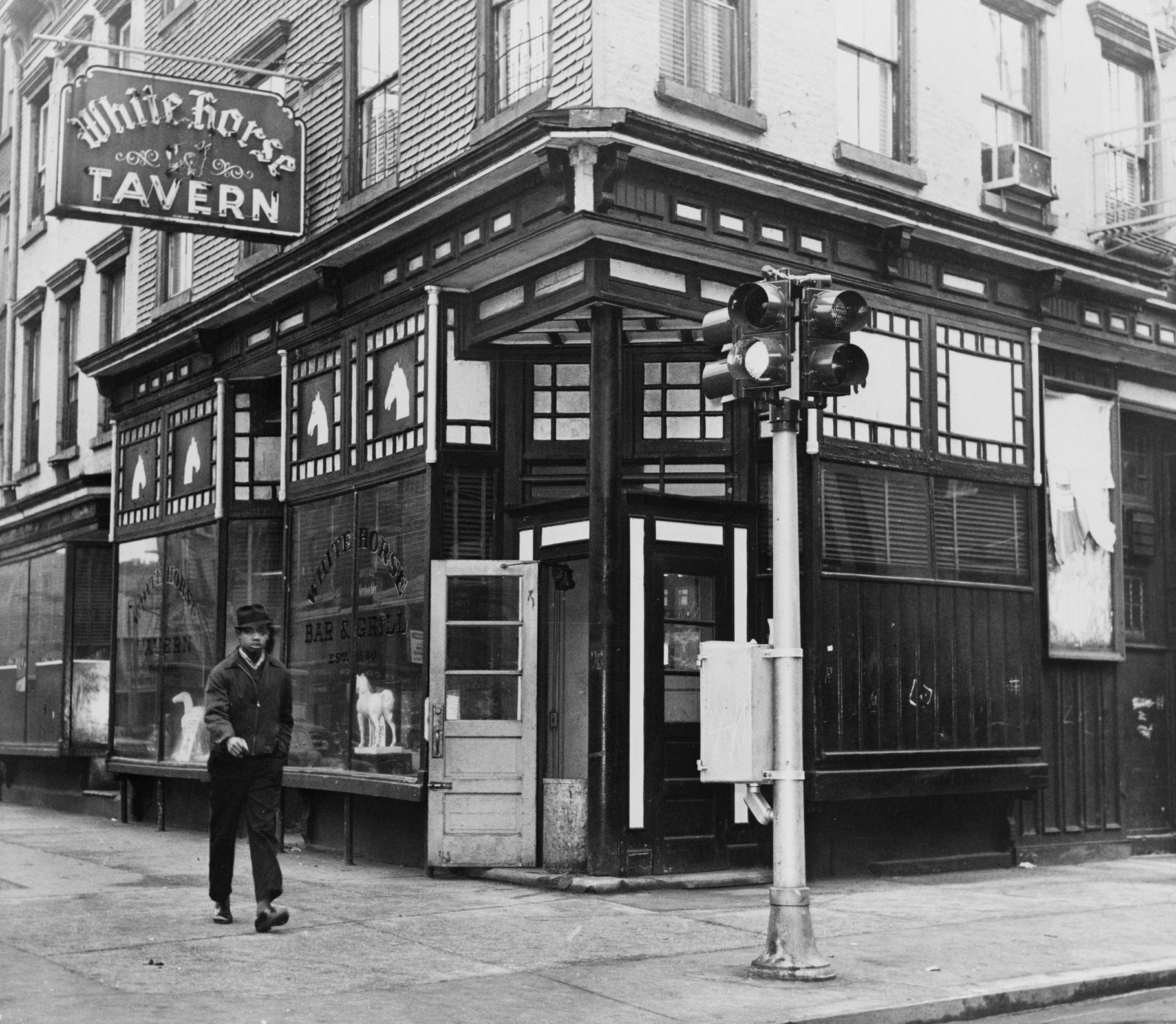
An early two-light traffic signal by White Horse Tavern in Hudson Street, New York, 1961

Traffic lights were first introduced in December 1868 in London to assist police officers controlling traffic. Since then, electricity and computerised control has advanced traffic light technology and increased intersection capacity.

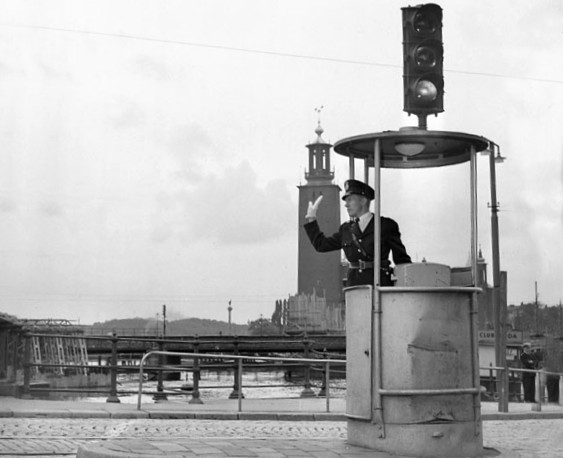
A traffic light in Stockholm, 1953

== The origins of traffic signals ==
Before traffic lights, traffic police controlled the flow of traffic. A well-documented example is that on London Bridge in 1722. Three men were given the task of directing traffic coming in and out of either London or Southwark. Each officer directed traffic coming out of Southwark into London, making sure all traffic stayed on the west side of the bridge. A second officer directed traffic on the east side of the bridge to control the flow of people leaving London and going into Southwark.

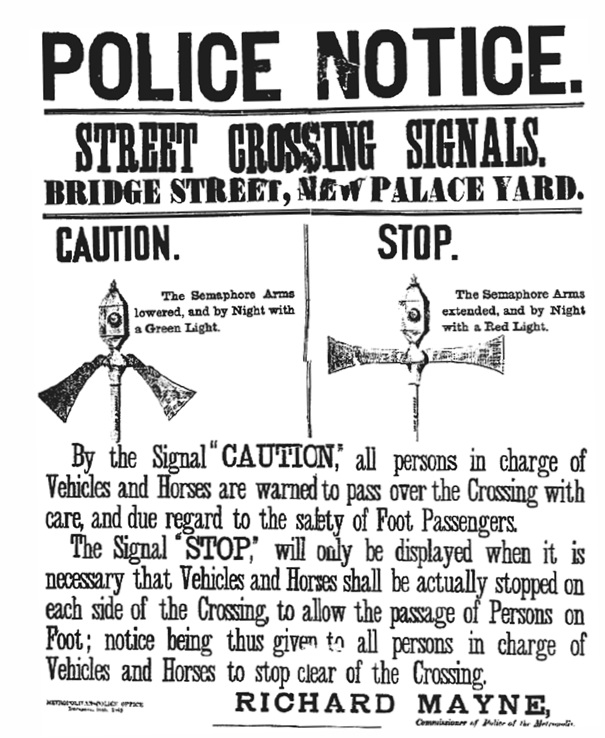
Police Notice published in 1868 illustrating street crossing signals outside UK Parliament

On 9 December 1868, the first manually-operated traffic signals showing a red or green light at night were installed outside the Houses of Parliament in London. They were installed to allow pedestrians, especially MPs hurrying to vote in Parliament, to cross Bridge Street. They were proposed by the railway engineer J. P. Knight of Nottingham who had adapted this idea from his design of railway signaling systems and constructed by the railway signal engineers of Saxby & Farmer.

The design combined three semaphore arms surmounted by a gas lantern for night-time use. The entire apparatus was 22 feet (6.7 m) high. A police constable moved a crank which raised or lowered all three semaphore arms and rotated by 90° the red-and-green glass of the lantern (see cross-section). When the arms were horizontal, those in charge of vehicles and horses were to "Stop" clear of the crossing. When the arms were lowered to a 45 degrees angle, they could proceed with "Caution". At night the gas lantern at the top was lit so that it showed red lights to pedestrians and green lights to vehicles or vice versa.

Although it was said to be successful at controlling traffic, its operational life was brief. It exploded on 2 January 1869 as a result of a gas leak and injured the policeman who was operating it.

== Pre-electric signals (1869-1912) ==
Despite the failure of the world's first traffic light in London in 1869, by 1880, traffic lights spread all over the world. The early traffic lights in the late 19th century were very different from the ones that exist now. In the first two decades of the 20th century, semaphore traffic signals like the one in London were in use all over the United States with each state having its own design of the device.

One example was from Toledo, Ohio, in 1908. The words "Stop" and "Go" were in white on a green background and the lights had red and green lenses illuminated by kerosene lamps for night travellers and the arms were 8 feet (2.4 m) above ground. It was controlled by a traffic officer who would blow a whistle before changing the commands on this signal to help alert travellers of the change. The design was also used in Philadelphia and Detroit. The example in Ohio was the first time America tried to use a more visible form of traffic control that involved the use of semaphores. The device that was used in Ohio was designed based on the use of railroad signals.

In 1912, a traffic control device was placed on top of a tower in Paris at the intersection of rue Montmartre and the boulevard Montmartre. This tower signal was operated by a policewoman and she used a revolving four-sided metal box on top of a glass showcase where the word "Stop" was painted in red and the word "Go" painted in white.

== Electric signals ==
In 1912, the first electric traffic light was developed by Lester Wire, a policeman in Salt Lake City, Utah. It was installed by the American Traffic Signal Company on the corner of East 105th Street and Euclid Avenue in Cleveland, Ohio. It had two colors, red and green, and a buzzer, based on the design of James Hoge, to provide a warning for color changes. The design by James Hoge allowed police and fire stations to control the signals in case of emergency.

In 1917, the first interconnected traffic signal system was installed in Salt Lake City, with six connected intersections controlled simultaneously from a manual switch.

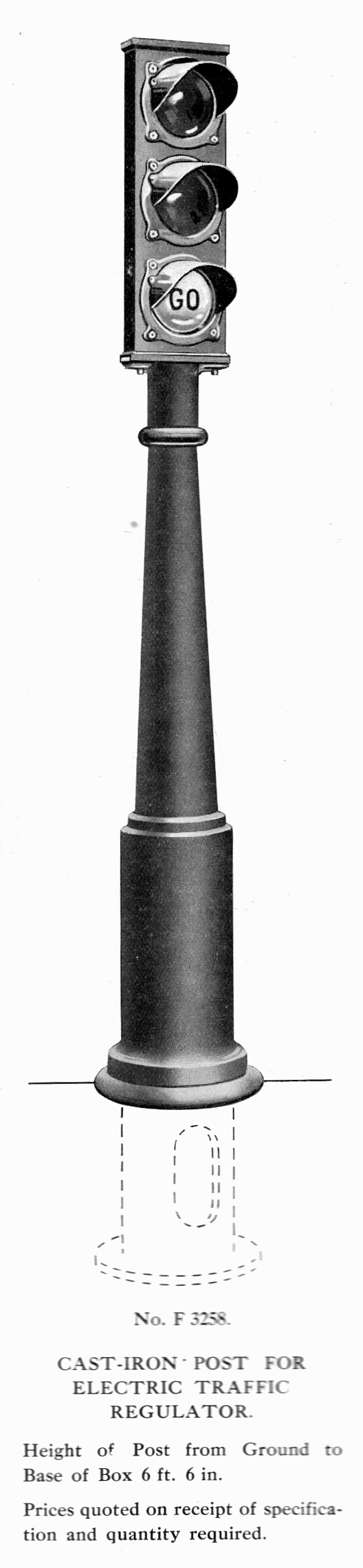
An advertisement for an "Electric Traffic Regulator" in a 1930 Pryke & Palmer

In 1920, the first four-way, three-color traffic light was created by police officer William Potts in Detroit, Michigan. He was concerned about how police officers at four different lights signals could not change their lights all at the same time. The answer was a third light that was colored amber, which was the same color used on the railroad. Potts placed a timer with the light to help coordinate the lights. A tower was used to mount the lights as the junction at which it was installed was one of the busiest in the world, with over 20,000 vehicles a day.

In October 1920, Los Angeles installed its first automated traffic signals at five locations on Broadway. These early signals, manufactured by the Acme Traffic Signal Co., paired "Stop" and "Go" semaphore arms with small red and green lights. Bells played the role of today's amber lights, ringing when the flags changed—a process that took five seconds. By 1923 the city had installed 31 Acme traffic control devices.

=== Automatic electric signals ===
In 1922, traffic towers were beginning to be controlled by automatic timers. The first company to add timers in traffic lights was Crouse-Hinds. They built railroad signals and were the first company to place timers in traffic lights in Houston, their home city. The timer saved cities money by replacing traffic officers. New York City was able to reassign all but 500 of its 6,000 officers working on the traffic squad. This saved New York $12,500,000. In 1927, Wolverhampton was the first British town to introduce automated traffic lights in Princes Square, at the junction of Lichfield Street and Princess Street on a trial basis. Great Britain's first permanent automated traffic lights were opened in March 1928 in Leeds, on the corner of Park Row and Bond Street.

The introduction of automated traffic signals required a change of behavior for pedestrians. Most urban groups welcomed traffic lights; signals were seen by many as favorable to police officer control because they were not affected by potential human biases such as racism or mistrust of transit companies. After witnessing an accident between an automobile and a horse-drawn carriage, inventor Garrett Morgan filed a U.S. patent for a traffic signal. Patent No. 1,475,024 was granted on 20 November 1923 for Morgan's three-position traffic signal.

A further development of traffic signals were staggered systems. These allowed the implementation of early green waves, so that vehicles travelling at a certain speed along a single street would only encounter green lights. In 1926, the first staggered system was installed on Sixteenth Street, Washington, D.C., leading to a doubling of commuting speed.

In 1928, the twelve-light system was invented. Hoods were placed over the light and each lens was sand-blasted to increase daytime visibility. Both the tower and semaphores were phased out by 1930. Towers were too big and obstructed traffic. Semaphores were too small and drivers could not see them at night.

Ashville, Ohio, claims to be the home of the oldest working traffic light in the world, used at an intersection of public roads from 1932 to 1982 when it was moved to a local museum. Guinness World Records backed this claim by naming it the Oldest functional traffic light.

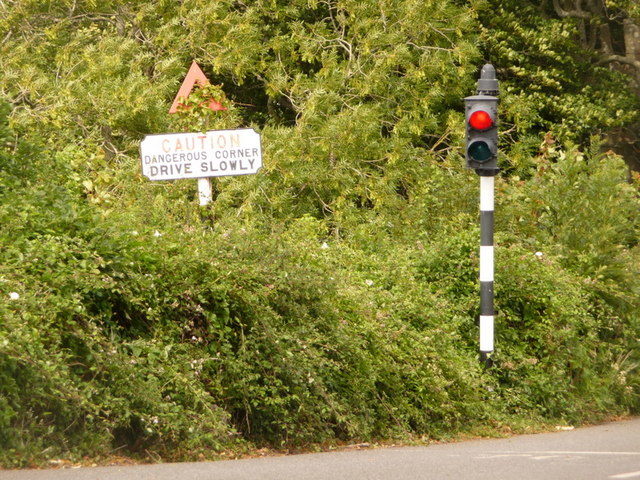
Carisbrooke: old sign and traffic lights by the castle

A pair of two-light (red and green) Electro-matic traffic signals believed to date from the 1930s are still in use at a bend around a bastion on the road leading to Carisbrooke Castle on the Isle of Wight, England. The public road B3341 stops just before these lights, so although in situ, they are not on the public highway, are part of the site of an ancient monument and have thereby escaped replacement.

In 1949, the first traffic light in the continent of Asia was installed in Haifa, Israel. In 1953, the first traffic light in South India was installed at Egmore Junction, Chennai. In 1963, the city of Bangalore installed its first traffic light at Corporation Circle.

== Computerised signals ==
The control of traffic lights changed with the rise of computers in America in the 1950s. The changing of lights made traffic flow even better thanks to computerised detection. A pressure plate was placed at intersections so that computers would know that a car was waiting at the red light. Some of this detection included knowing the number of waiting cars against the red light and the length of time waited by the first vehicle at the red.

One of the best historical examples of computerized control of lights was in Denver in 1952. One computer took control of 120 lights, with six pressure-sensitive detectors measuring inbound and outbound traffic. The control room that housed the computer in charge of the system was in the basement of the City and County Building. As computers started to evolve, traffic light control improved and became easier. In 1967, Toronto was the first to use more advanced computers that were better at vehicle detection. The computers maintained control over 159 signals in the cities through telephone lines.

In the 1990s, countdown timers on traffic lights were introduced. Timers are useful for pedestrians, to plan whether there is enough time to cross the intersection before the end of the walk phase, and for drivers, to know the amount of time before the light switches. In the United States, timers for vehicle traffic are prohibited, but pedestrian timers are now required on new or upgraded signals on wider roadways. Some pedestrian timers can be used by motorists to know how much time remains in the green cycle, because often when the pedestrian timer reaches zero, the signal will simultaneously turn amber.

== Lighting technologies ==
When incandescent lamps began to replace gas-powered lamps, it was necessary to incorporate a coloured lens in red, yellow or green to produce the signals, as incandescent bulbs can only shine white light. In France, the units were equipped with a reflector and a different-coloured lens of a type such as Fresnel, prismatic or others. The drawbacks of these were their short lifetime and a glare effect: when the sun was shining on the coloured lens, it was often impossible to identify which signal was in operation. To reduce this glare, traffic lights have often since been equipped with visors.

In the 1960s, new lighting sources, using a discharge tube, began to be deployed. The patent of the Silec Society filed in 1957 explains this technology. The advantages were that the light source did not need a coloured lens. This technology resolved the glare effect, reduced energy consumption and lengthened the lifetime when compared with incandescent sources.

In 1980, incandescent lamps were improved, with a lower 12V voltage, increased lifetime and reduced energy consumption.

At the first of the 1980s, the introduction of light-emitting diode (LED) lights resulted in an even longer replacement cycle and lower energy use. The first patent filed in 1982 by Thery Hindrick en France with a matrice of LED with electronic components

In 1988, Garbarini, a French plant, diffused the first commercial LED product with a LED repeater, the model Design 2000. Main blocks could not be equipped with LED because the green light was, then, too low for a correct visibility.

In 1989, the first LED main traffic light was put in service in California. The system was created by Electro-techs in Corona (California), a company created by Raymond Deese in 1981.
