= Mount Wire =

Mountain in the American state of Utah

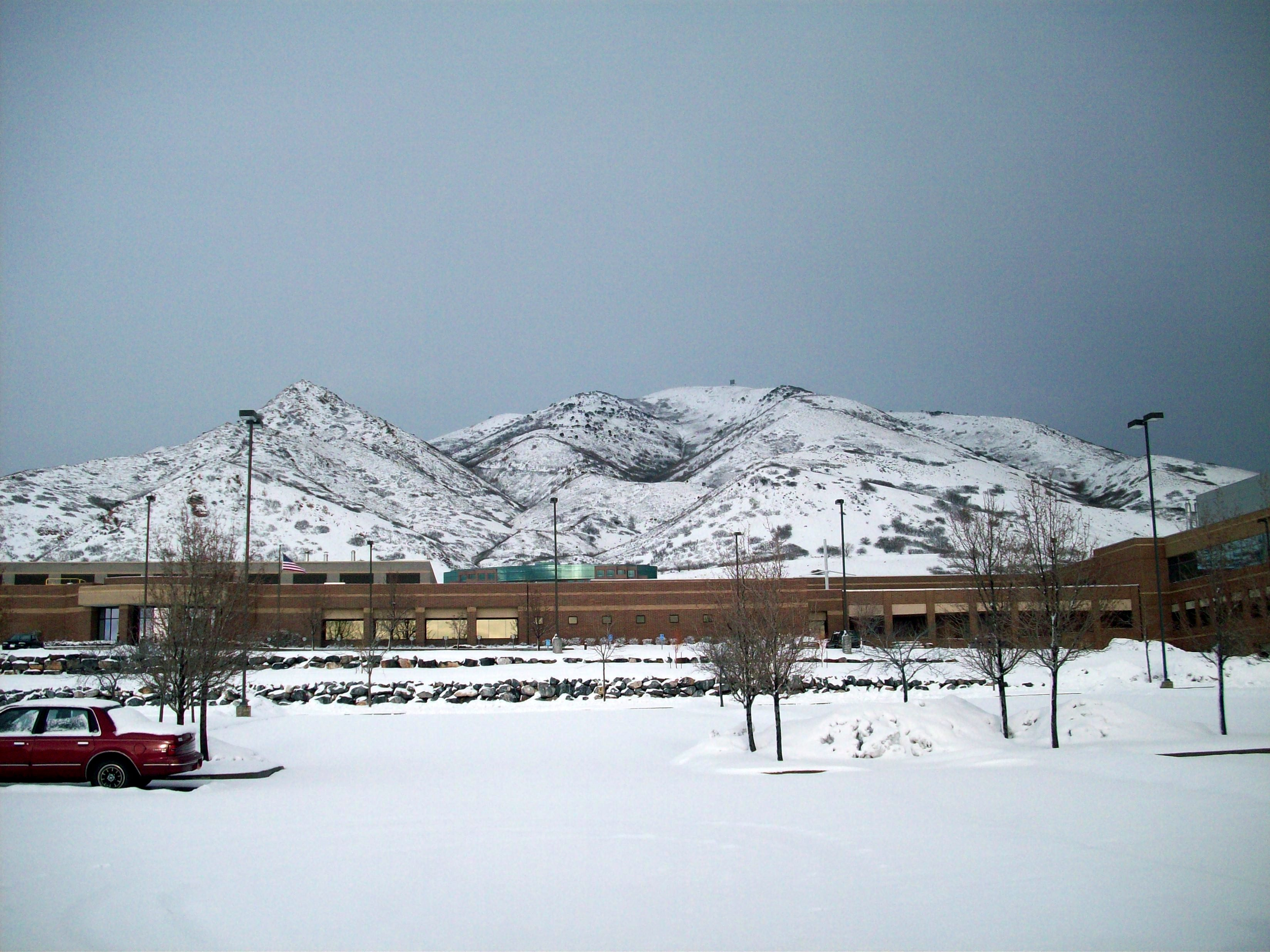
- Mt. Wire from the University of Utah

Highest point
- Elevation: 7,146 ft (2,178 m) NAVD 88
- Prominence: 103 ft (31 m)
- Coordinates: 40°46′14″N 111°47′54″W

Naming
- Etymology: Lester Wire

Geography
- Location within Utah
- Location: Salt Lake County, Utah, U.S.
- Parent range: Wasatch Mountains

Climbing
- Easiest route: Hike

Mount Wire (also known as Wire Mountain or Big Beacon) is a mountain located on the east side of Salt Lake City, Utah with an elevation of 7,146 feet (2,178 m). The mountain is named after Lester Wire, an American policeman of Salt Lake City, Utah, who in 1912 developed the first red-green electric traffic light. Mount Wire is a common spot for adventurous hikers and has many access trails, some created by nearby Red Butte Gardens. The east side of the University of Utah offers direct access to trails to the summit. Mount Wire formerly could be identified from other nearby mountains by its two passive microwave repeaters near the summit. These billboard like structures were used to bounce microwave signals over the mountain to the north-eastern parts of Utah. Mount Wire also houses an old airway beacon directly on the summit. An interesting man-made rock outcropping about halfway up the mountain looks like several lawn chairs in a row, and is a common rest stop for hikers. This stop offers views of Salt Lake City, and the Wasatch Mountains.

== Hiking ==
Hiking to the summit can be moderately difficult as the terrain is fairly unforgiving. Trails are not marked, but are in good condition, depending on which side a hiker climbs. Access from the west side of the mountain is often the easiest, as the trails are clearer. Hiking the mountain takes about two hours for the average hiker, again depending on trail and weather conditions. It is advisable that any hiker wanting to get to the summit carry plenty of water and food. More athletic hikers can reach the summit in about 45 minutes with a water bottle in hand.

== The Summit ==
Once on the summit, the entire Salt Lake Valley can be seen from North Salt Lake to Point of the Mountain and Draper. To the north, Antelope Island is clearly visible as is the neighboring mountain, Mount Van Cott. To the west, the entire Oquirrh mountain range. To the south and east, Emigration Canyon and the Wasatch Range are visible.

An old airway beacon, now out of service, is on the highest point of the mountain and can be climbed for better views of the surrounding terrain. It has been vandalized by many people writing their names and the dates they reached the summit. Some of the dates are as old as 1954. Evidence of power to the beacon is still present in the surrounding area. Old electrical wire is strewn about in various places, and rusted conduit is still present, along with boxes that contained breakers.

On November 9, 2013 the two large passive microwave repeaters directly southwest of the beacon were removed. These were used to reflect microwave radio communications from Salt Lake to northeastern Utah. They had also been heavily vandalized.

An unimproved road for ATVs and four-wheel drive vehicles also exists for those who do not want to hike to the summit, and starts in Emigration Canyon directly to the east. This road begins on private property however, and reaching the summit via vehicle is strongly discouraged as parts of this mountain are on National Forest lands, where such vehicles are prohibited. The road terminates at the radio repeaters.

== Gallery ==
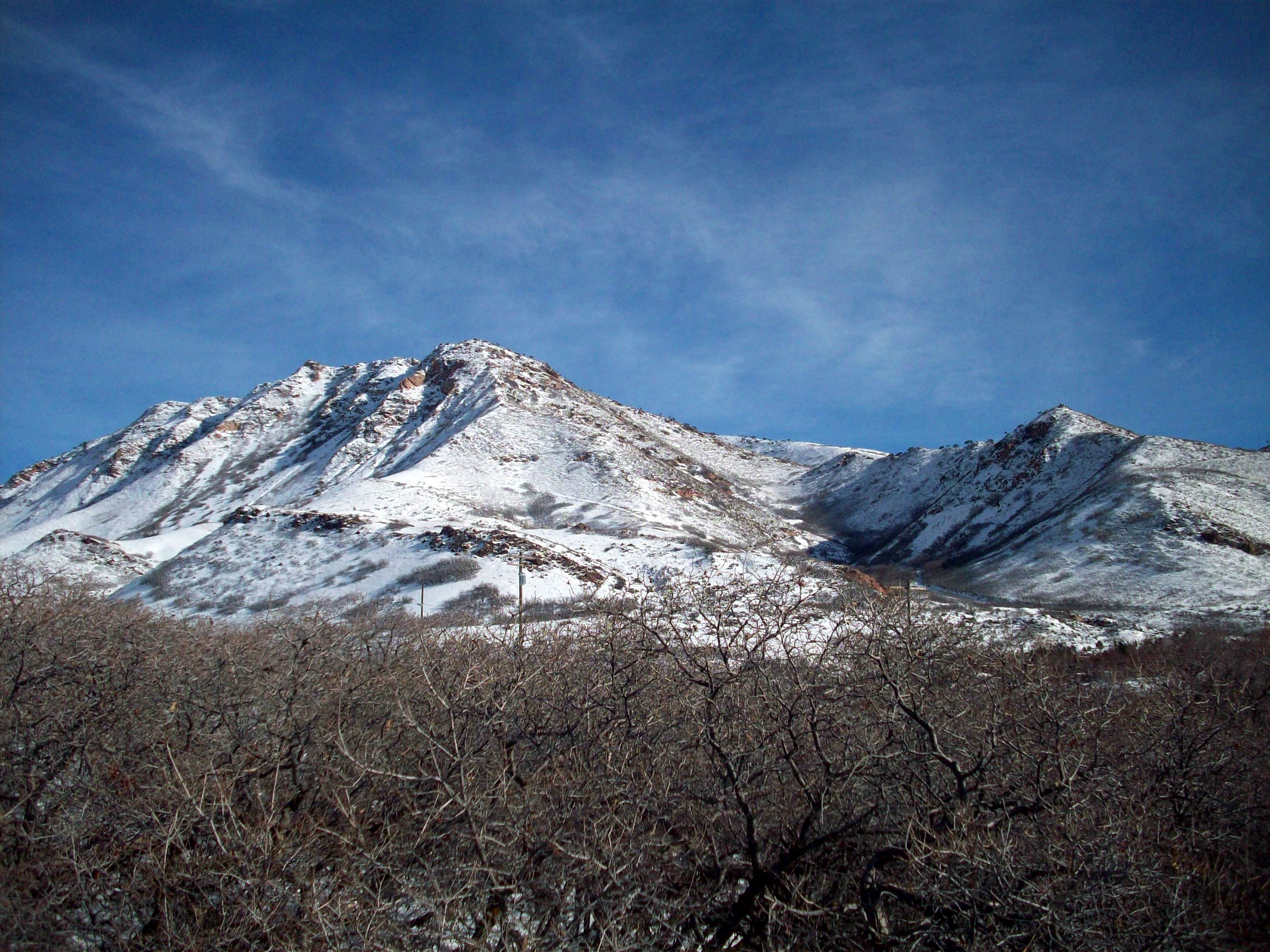
Red Butte, directly adjacent to Mount Wire in January 2008.

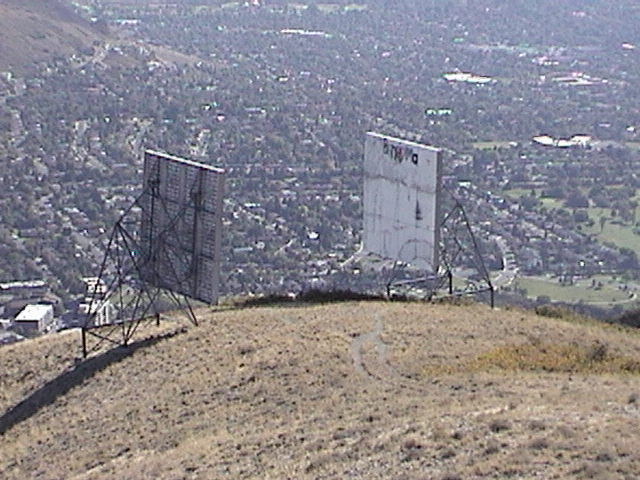
The two microwave radio reflectors directly below the summit. They were removed in late 2013.

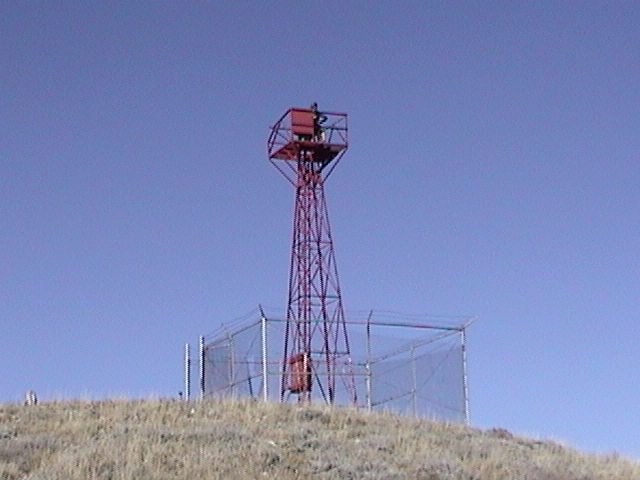
The old airway beacon directly on the summit.

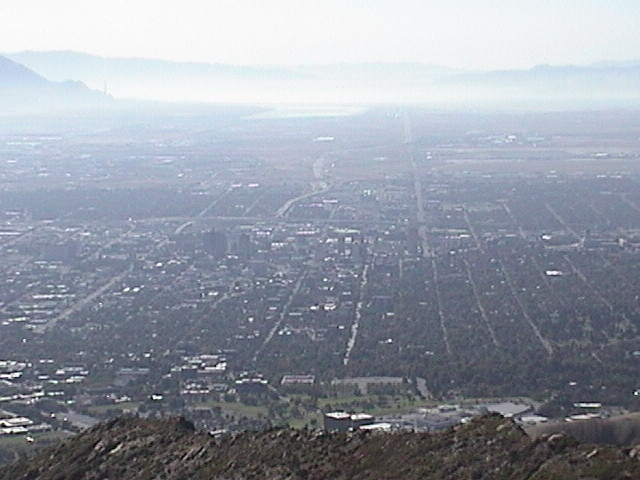
Downtown Salt Lake City, as seen from the summit of Mount Wire.
