= Calvary Church (Brighton) =

Evangelical church in Brighton, England

- Calvary Evangelical Church
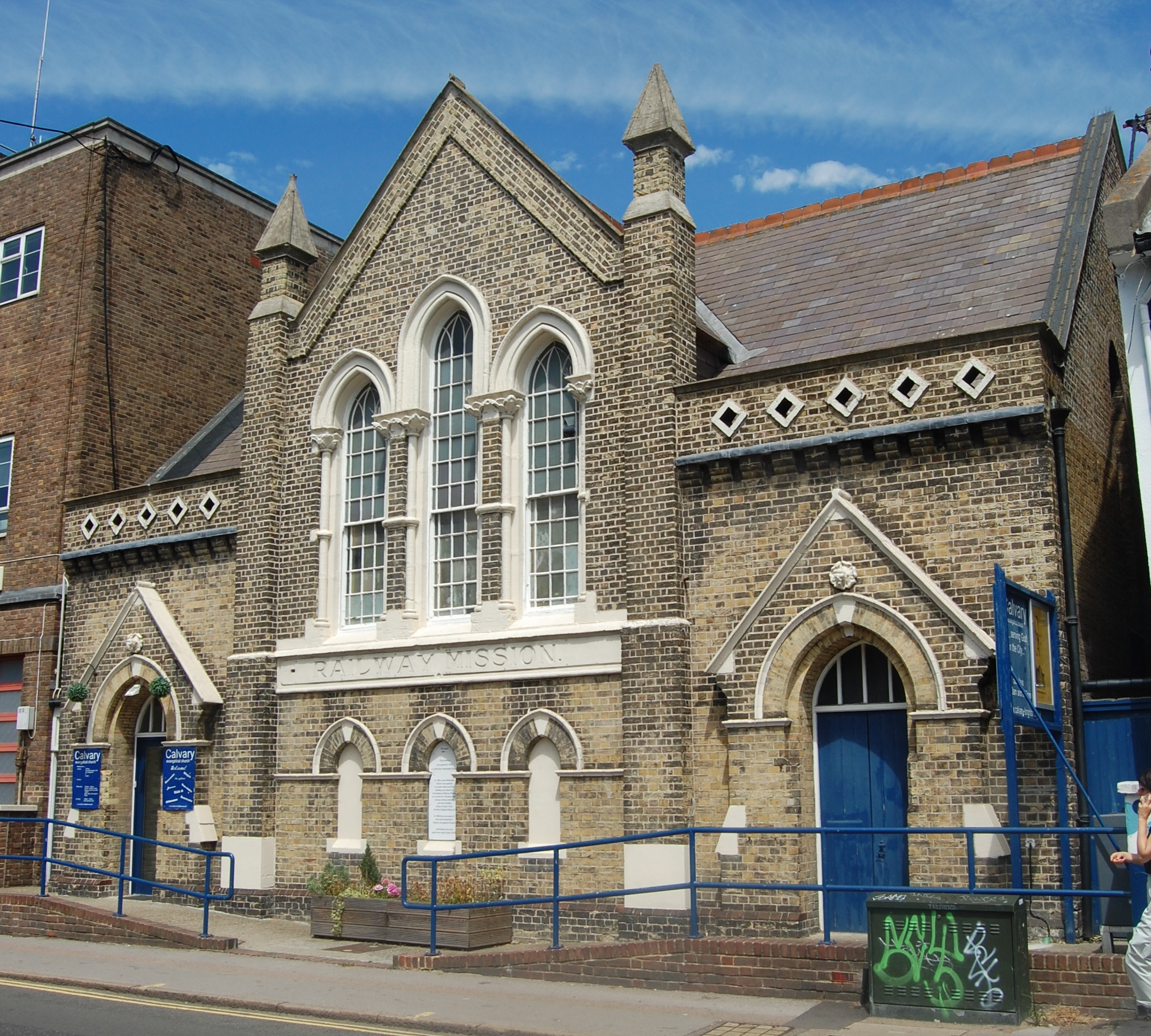
- The church from the southeast in 2019
- Calvary Church
- 50.8336°N 0.1379°W
- Location: 72 Viaduct Road, Brighton, Brighton and Hove BN1 4ND
- Country: England
- Denomination: Evangelical
- Previous denomination: Primitive Methodist
- Website: calvary-brighton.org.uk/

History
- Former name(s): Primitive Methodist Chapel (1876–1894); Railway Mission Hall (1894–1984)
- Status: Church
- Founded: 1876 (as Primitive Methodist chapel)
- Founder: Revd William Dinnick
- Events: 1894: sold to Brighton Railway Mission; 1984: Became an independent church

Architecture
- Functional status: Active
- Heritage designation: Locally listed building
- Designated: 2015
- Architect: James Barnes
- Style: Early English Gothic Revival
- Completed: 1876

Specifications
- Materials: Brick

Calvary Church is an independent evangelical church in Brighton, part of the English city of Brighton and Hove. It is located on Viaduct Road in the Round Hill area of the city, next door to the fire station on Preston Circus. It is affiliated with the Fellowship of Independent Evangelical Churches, the Sussex Gospel Partnership, and more recently, the Evangelical Alliance. The yellow-brick Gothic Revival building, designed by James Barnes, was erected in 1876 for a congregation of Primitive Methodists at the initiative of Rev. William Dinnick, but this church moved to new premises in 1894 and the Railway Mission took over. The Mission sold its buildings in the 1980s, and like many others in Britain the Brighton church became independent. It is on Brighton and Hove City Council's local list of heritage assets.

== History ==
The area between London Road (now the A23), Ditchling Road and the Lewes Road, north of central Brighton, developed into a densely built-up working-class residential area after the opening of the railway and the construction of the London Road Viaduct, especially in the 1860s and 1870s when "humble terraces became the norm" in the area. Viaduct Road, connecting the London and Ditchling Roads, was built up from the 1860s and in 1873 was designated the northern boundary of the parish and, later, the Borough of Brighton.

A Primitive Methodist chapel opened on the north side of the road in 1876. The job of designing and building the chapel was put out to tender in April of that year; of the seven architects who entered, the bid by James Barnes, costed at £1,194, was accepted. Foundation stones for the new chapel were laid at a ceremony on Monday 1 May that year. Rev. W. Rowe gave an address about "the progress and the principles of the church". £366 6s. had been raised towards the cost of the building by this date. The ceremony continued with a tea at the Royal Pavilion. The chapel was dedicated five months later, on Sunday 17 September; services, again led by Rev. Rowe, were held in the morning and evening. The chapel's founder, Rev. William Dinnick, moved to Brighton in early 1876 from the Isle of Thanet, where he had established 11 Primitive Methodist chapels during his eight-year position as superintendent of the Ramsgate Circuit. He held the same position in Brighton for 25 years until his death in 1901.

By the 1870s, Brighton railway works, close to Viaduct Road on the other side of London Road, was a major employer in the area – particularly following a major expansion between 1854 and the early 1860s. In March 1876, a non-denominational Christian mission was formed for the workers: it originated with three of the employees – two porters and a ticket collector – began to meet at Brighton station on Sunday afternoons for Bible studies and singing. They enlisted the help of a Mrs Parkinson to lead a weekly gospel service, but she had to withdraw for health reasons. They then asked Mrs Elizabeth Gates, the wife of local brewer George Gates, to help them. On 19 March 1876, she led the first meeting of the Brighton Railway Mission, held in one of the station's waiting rooms. The mission was the first such mission to be undertaken specifically for railway workers, and pre-dated the formation of the national Railway Mission by five years. It later spread more widely: by 1892 there were more than 300 separate "mission stations", as they were known at the time.

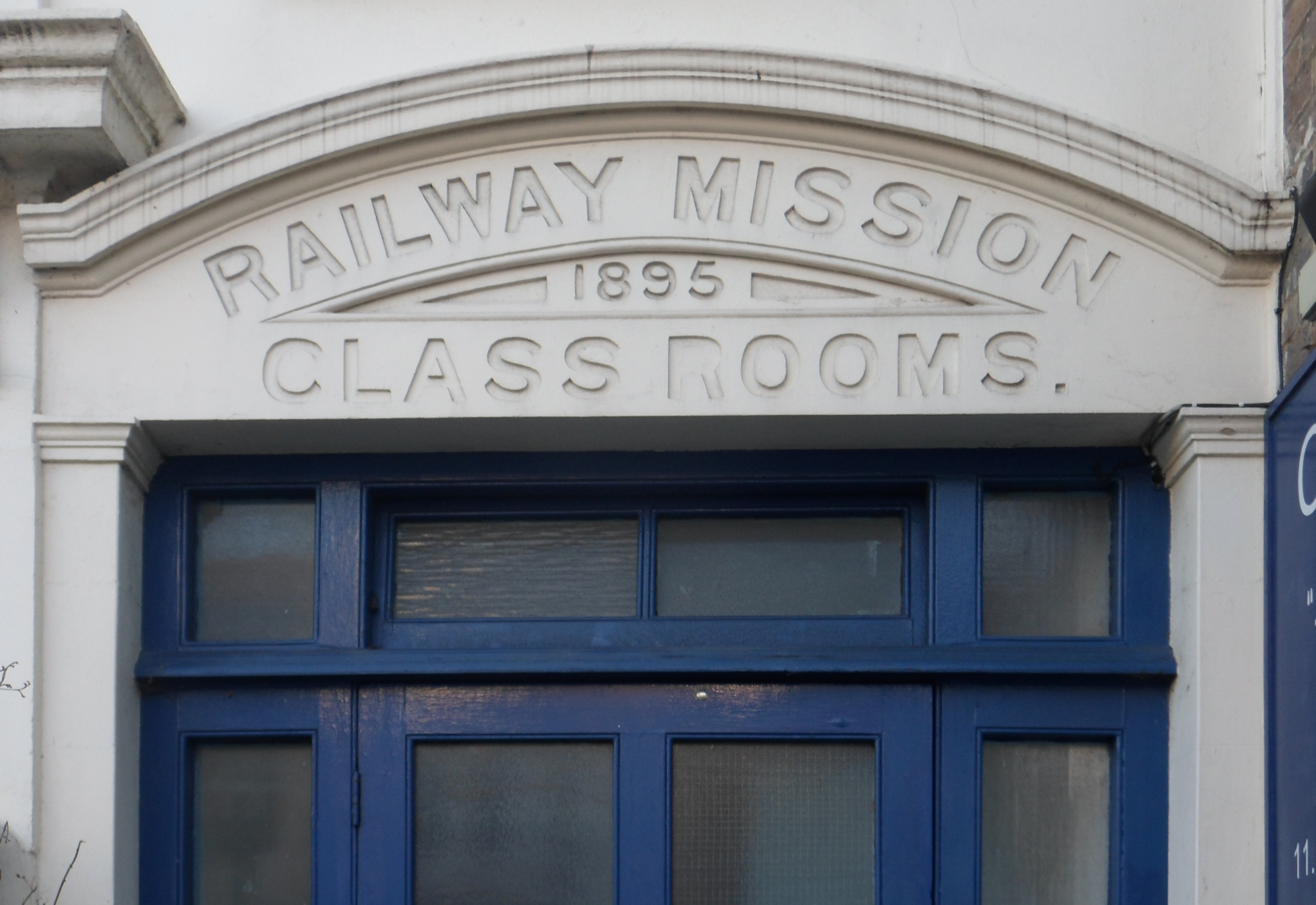
The former Sunday School classrooms face Stanley Road to the rear.

By 1882, the mission was holding three weekly meetings, now in the station's Reading Room/Library: Sundays at 3:15 p.m. for men and their wives, Wednesdays at 8 p.m. for men, and alternate Thursday afternoons at 3:30 p.m. Some informal Bible readings were held elsewhere at other times, including at Peel Street. These meetings drew up to 400 people.

Eleven years later, the railway planned necessary extensions which meant the Reading Room was required for other uses. This led Mrs Gates to raise money to buy a building. £2,500 was raised, which enabled the mission to purchase the former Primitive Methodist chapel – the congregation having outgrown it and moved to a new chapel on London Road in 1894. The building was altered in many ways, and eventually, in 1894, the mission was able to meet there. As numbers grew, there was a desire to begin Sunday school work. The work amongst children began with just 15 but by 1901 had grown to 194 children. Mrs Gates also built the building behind the mission hall, which was then extended with more rooms upstairs for children's work. This was completed in December 1902. The success of this work led to the purchase of the house next door. By 1909, there were as many as 394 children attending, with 50 workers to look after them. The premises were registered for worship on 16 November 1906. Registration for the solemnisation of marriages followed in May 1927.

Mrs Gates died on 23 July 1911, having been superintendent of the mission for 35 years. Her funeral took place four days later at the mission hall. The local press were full of praise for her ministry. Charles Spurgeon, the son of the preacher Charles Haddon Spurgeon, conducted her funeral service, at which she was described as "The Railwayman's Friend". There is a memorial plaque commemorating her inside the church, as well as one for John Peake Knight (1828–1886), inventor of the traffic light.

The mission gradually became more and more a local church, branching beyond its original outreach to railway workers. Nationally, most Railway Mission halls were formally became independent of the Railway Mission in the 1980s, and this happened at Brighton in July 1984, when the church changed its registered name to Calvary Evangelical Church. The church building was purchased from the Mission in 2014.

Following the closure in 2006 of the Methodist church on London Road, Calvary Church let out the back of the building where the large Sunday school used to meet to the Brighton and Hove City Mission.

== Architecture ==
The mission hall was built in the Early English Gothic Revival style to the design of architect James Barnes. It has a symmetrical façade with its long wall parallel to Viaduct Road. The central section of the façade is gabled and has three tall lancet windows flanked by tall pyramidal finials. To each side are slightly recessed doorways with projecting entrance porch-like elements. A "curious" band of machicolations sits above these, giving the impression of "a toy castle". The brickwork is dark yellow. The words railway mission are inscribed below the lancet windows. Above each doorway is a figurehead decoration.

Brighton and Hove City Council added the mission hall to their local list of heritage assets in 2015, describing it as "a well-executed example of a modest late 19th-century chapel building [which] contribut[es] greatly to the street scene". It also noted that the façade is largely intact.

== Pastors ==
Since 1975, the church has been served by various pastors and, latterly, eldership teams:

- Les Hill (Elder 1975–1989)
- John Cropley (Full-time paid Elder 1983–1989)
- Philip Wells (1975 unpaid Elder, 1989–2022 Full-time paid Elder, 2023-present unpaid Elder))
- Rhod Thomas (unpaid Elder, retired in 2006)
- Chris Fry (unpaid Elder, died in 2020)
- Ben Alltimes (Elder, left in 2021)
- Jerome Peirson (Unpaid Elder, 2024–present)
- Daniel Chapallaz (Trainee Elder, September 2022; full-time paid Elder 2023–)

Notably, Pastor Philip Wells has been in leadership at the church for over 50 years. In 1975, he became an unpaid elder. From 1989, after the sudden death of Les Hill, he was employed full-time, a role he held until September 2022. He has remained an elder in the church since that time.

== The church today ==
The church is affiliated with the Sussex Gospel Partnership and the Fellowship of Independent Evangelical Churches, the latter since 2008, but has no formal denominational links. Its theology is broadly Calvinist.

The church is still active in its ministry today. Two services are held every Sunday, at 11 a.m. and 6:30 p.m., with a variety of ages and nationalities present. The morning services attract between 60 and 90 people, whilst the evenings tend to be smaller, with around 20 to 30 people present. There is an active Sunday school ministry and a monthly youth group. During the week, there are prayer meetings, Bible studies, men's and women's breakfasts, and a ladies' craft group. The church also seeks to reach out to the area with various events taking place throughout the year.

The church has a strong emphasis on word ministry. The sermons are the heart of the service and are usually expository in style, working through books of the Bible. There is a strong tradition of hymn singing, both old and new.

== See also ==
- List of places of worship in Brighton and Hove
- Media related to Calvary Evangelical Church, Brighton at Wikimedia Commons

== Bibliography ==
- Antram, Nicholas; Morrice, Richard (2008). Brighton and Hove. Pevsner Architectural Guides. London: Yale University Press. ISBN 978-0-300-12661-7.
- Carder, Timothy (1990). The Encyclopaedia of Brighton. Lewes: East Sussex County Libraries. ISBN 0-86147-315-9.
- Cooper, B.K. (1981). Rail Centres: Brighton. Shepperton: Ian Allan Ltd. ISBN 0-7110-1155-9.
