= NRCS =

NRCS may refer to:

- National Rail Chaplaincy Service, UK
- National Red Cross/Crescent Societies, the collected national branches of the worldwide aid charity
- National Regulator for Compulsory Specifications, an agency of the South African Government Department of Trade and Industry
- National Replacement Character Set, a character set for computer terminals
- Natural Resources Conservation Service, a US government agency
- Nepal Red Cross Society, an aid charity
- Nigerian Red Cross Society, an aid charity
