= William Potts (inventor) =

Inventor of the modern traffic light

- Born: May 1883; Bad Axe, Michigan, U.S.
- Died: 1947
- Occupation: Police officer
- Known for: Three-lens traffic light
- Spouse: Grace (Baker) Potts (m. 1910)
- Children: 4

William Potts (May 1883 – 1947) was an American police officer who is credited with inventing the modern, three-lens traffic light in Detroit in 1920 (a gas-powered, two-lens, red/green traffic signal was invented in London in 1868 by John Peake Knight, though after a short test installation, traffic lights were not seen again in the United Kingdom until 1929).

== Biography ==
Potts was born in Bad Axe, Michigan. The 1900 census lists Potts as 17 years old and a police officer. By 1910, he was married to Grace (Baker) Potts, and they subsequently had 4 children. Potts became the "superintendent, signal person police" for the city of Detroit.

The old system of police directing traffic had become increasingly outmoded; two-color signals, with green and red lights, already existed, but they did not leave drivers sufficient time to stop at high speeds. Some municipalities experimented with leaving the green on for a few seconds after the red was illuminated, to caution the driver that the right of way was soon to change. In 1917, Potts devised a new system by inventing a "yellow" or "amber" light which would shine after the green light and before the red light to indicate the impending transition.

In 1920, Potts designed the first four-way, three-color traffic signal tower, which was installed at the intersection of Woodward and Michigan Avenues in Detroit, in October 1920.

== In popular culture ==
In SyFy series The Magicians, Potts was inspired to develop the three-color traffic light by the colored aura of the moon.

== See also ==
- Lester Wire
- Traffic light
- Traffic-light signalling and operation
