= Sir William Pryke, 1st Baronet =

British businessman

Sir William Robert Pryke, 1st Baronet (15 March 1847 – 30 March 1932) was a British businessman who was Lord Mayor of London from 1925 to 1926.

== Biography ==
The son of Richard Reeve Pryke, of Bury St Edmunds, Pyke was educated at the City of London College, after which he entered the office of a broker. With William Palmer, he founded Pryke & Palmer, iron and hardware merchants, based at 40 and 41 Upper Thames Street.

In 1887, he was elected to the Court of Common Council for Queenhithe Ward, eventually becoming Chief Commoner. He became an Alderman of the City of London for Queenhithe Ward in 1920 and was Sheriff of the City of London for 1920–21. As sheriff, he was knighted by the King on the occasion of his visit to the city on the reopening of Southwark Bridge in 1921. He then served as Lord Mayor of London for 1925–26. On 3 November 1926, he was created a Baronet, of Wanstead in the County of Essex.

Pryke was also a member of the Lee Conservancy Board, of the Wanstead Urban District Council, and of the Essex County Council, which he chaired for nine years.

== Family ==
Pyrke married in 1878 Marguerite Harriott (died 1925), daughter of Robert Stiles; they had three sons and two daughters.

== See also ==
- Pryke baronets
