= Edith Wire =

Edith Louise Wire (July 1899 – June 26, 1973) was an American composer, writer, and pianist with a strong interest in American history. She was born in Salt Lake City, Utah, and lived in her childhood home her entire life, with her brother Lester until his death in 1958. Wire studied at the Utah Conservatory of Music and with Dr. Georg Liebling in Los Angeles, California. As a pianist, she made several concert appearances in Los Angeles for large audiences and played on local radio stations as well.

Wire founded the Salt Lake City/ Matthais Farnsworth chapter of the National Society Daughters of the American Colonists in 1937 and served as honorary national vice president. She was president of the Colonial Dames of the 17th Century (Escalante chapter) in 1949, and president of the Utah State Society of Daughters of Founders and Patriots of America in 1963. She attempted to turn her family home into a museum honoring her brother Lester's traffic light invention, but funds ran out after her death. The Utah State Department of Transportation used the remaining assets of Edith's estate to create a different memorial for her brother: the Lester Farnsworth Wire Memorial Library in the new Department of Transportation building at 4501 South 2700 West in Salt Lake City. Wire wrote two books as well as songs and music for piano.

Her works include:

== Books ==
- Lester F. Wire: Savior of the Highways (1973)
- The Enchanted Island or The Adventures of Miss Sassyfras (1939)

== Piano ==
- Caprice
- Dusk in My Garden
- Figurine Coquette
- The Lotus Blossom
