= Lam Tin Park =

Urban public park in Hong Kong

Coordinates: 22.31085°N 114.24052°E

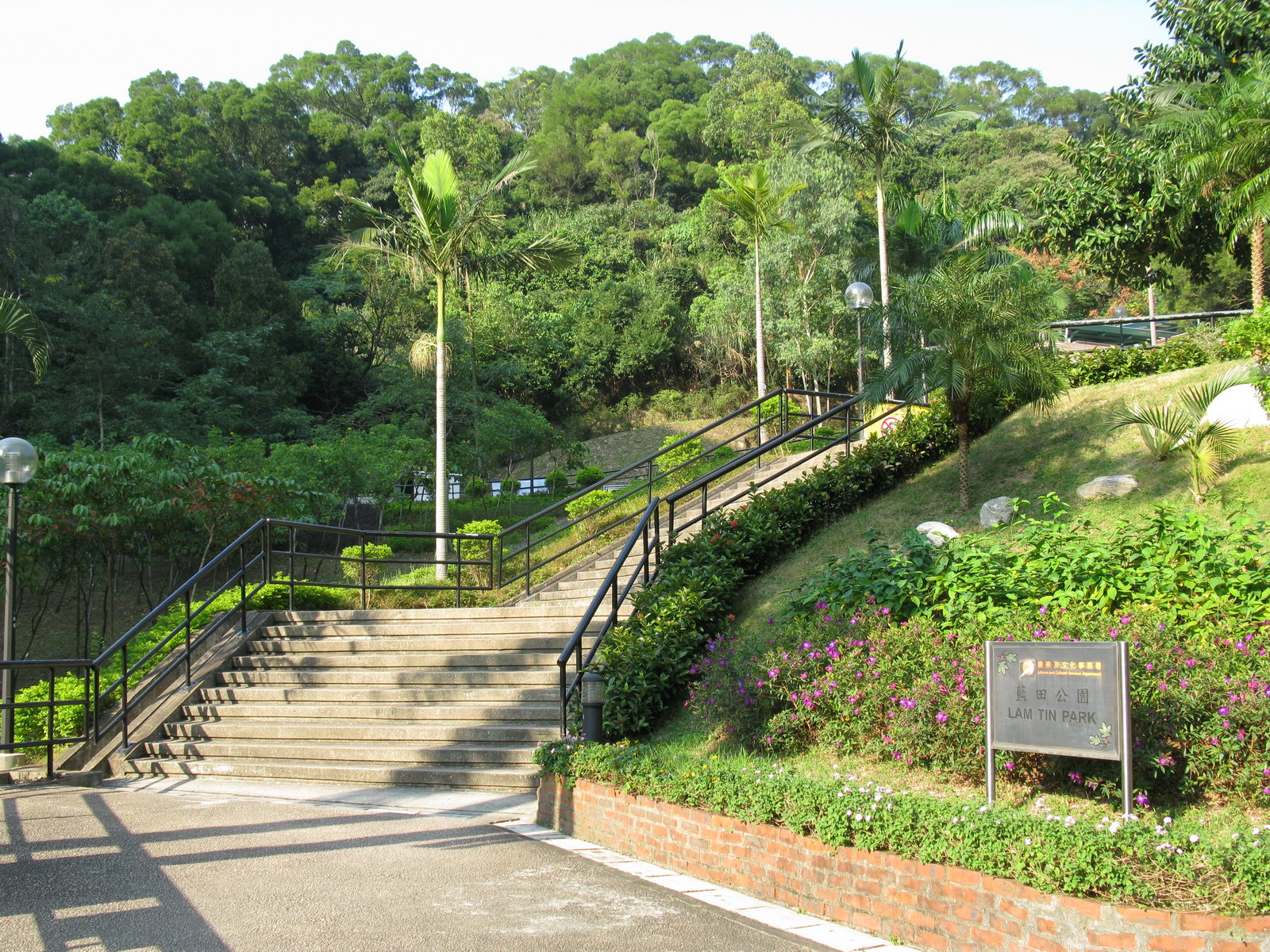
Lam Tin Park

Lam Tin Park (Chinese: 藍田公園) is a park located in Lam Tin, Kwun Tong District, Hong Kong. It is the largest park in Lam Tin. The park was built in 1991 along Black Hill, at the site of a landslide caused by a rainstorm in 1982. Facilities in the park include an outdoor arena, a children's playground, picnic zones, and fitness trails. The hill in the park has a lookout point with a view of the east of Victoria Harbour and Kowloon East.
