= Pryke baronets =

Baronetcy in the Baronetage of the United Kingdom

The Pryke Baronetcy, of Wanstead in the County of Essex, is a title in the Baronetage of the United Kingdom. It was created on 3 November 1926 for William Robert Pryke. He was Chairman of Pryke & Palmer Ltd, iron and hardware merchants, and served as Lord Mayor of London from 1925 to 1926.

== Pryke baronets, of Wanstead (1926) ==
Escutcheon of the Pryke baronets of Wanstead

- Sir William Robert Pryke, 1st Baronet (1847–1932)
- Sir (William Robert) Dudley Pryke, 2nd Baronet (1882–1959)
- Sir David Dudley Pryke, 3rd Baronet (1912–1998)
- Sir Christopher Dudley Pryke, 4th Baronet (born 1946)

The heir apparent is the present holder's son James Dudley Pryke (born 1977), whose heir is his son Oscar William Dudley Pryke (born 2016)
