= Passive repeater =

Type of radio-signal reflector

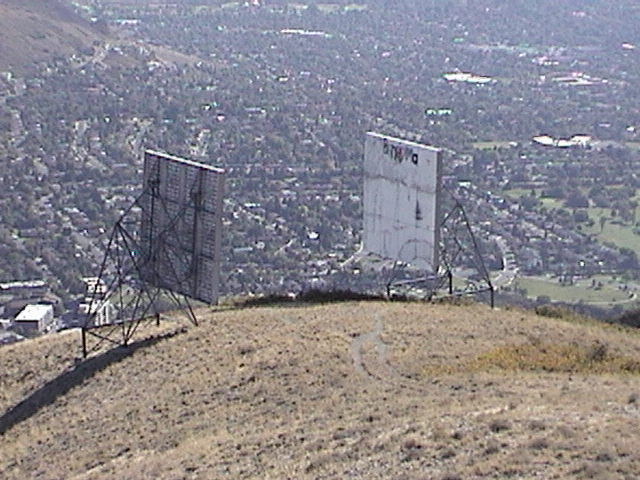
A typical passive microwave repeater link site, this one located near Salt Lake City, Utah, USA was removed in 2013

Operating principle

A passive repeater or passive radio link deflection, is a reflective or sometimes refractive panel or other object that assists in closing a radio or microwave link, in places where an obstacle in the signal path blocks any direct, line of sight communication.

Compared to a microwave radio relay station with active components, a passive repeater is far simpler and needs little maintenance and no on-site electric power. It also does not require additional frequencies, unlike active repeater stations which use different transmit and receive frequencies to prevent crosstalk. The corresponding disadvantage is that without amplification the returned signal is significantly weaker, although in some configurations they can actually provide gain of 100 to 130 dB for UHF and microwave radio-relay stations.

Passive radio relay link deflection systems in the vertical level can be realized by receiving the signal with a parabolic antenna and leading it through a waveguide to a second parabolic antenna, where it is radiated. For passive microwave radio relay link deflections in the horizontal plane, flat surfaces of metallic material are used, arranged so that the angle of incoming beam corresponds to the angle of the outcoming signal. The resulting structure resembles a billboard.

Similar systems are used also occasionally for TV relay transmitters or as tunnel transmitters. In these cases, a Yagi antenna receives the transmitted signal and supplies it by way of a coaxial cable to a second Yagi antenna.

Spherical balloon satellites were used in Project Echo as passive repeaters for various telecommunications experiments, including telephony.

== Photos of passive microwave repeaters ==
See also external links for photos of variety of other passive repeaters.

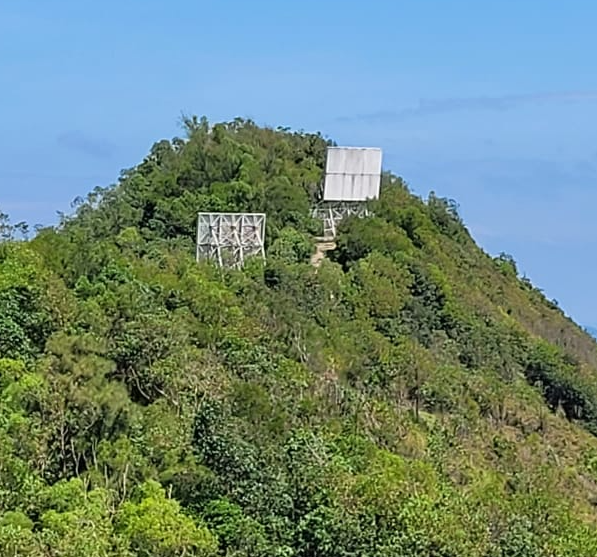
Passive Microwave repeaters on Black Hill, Hong Kong

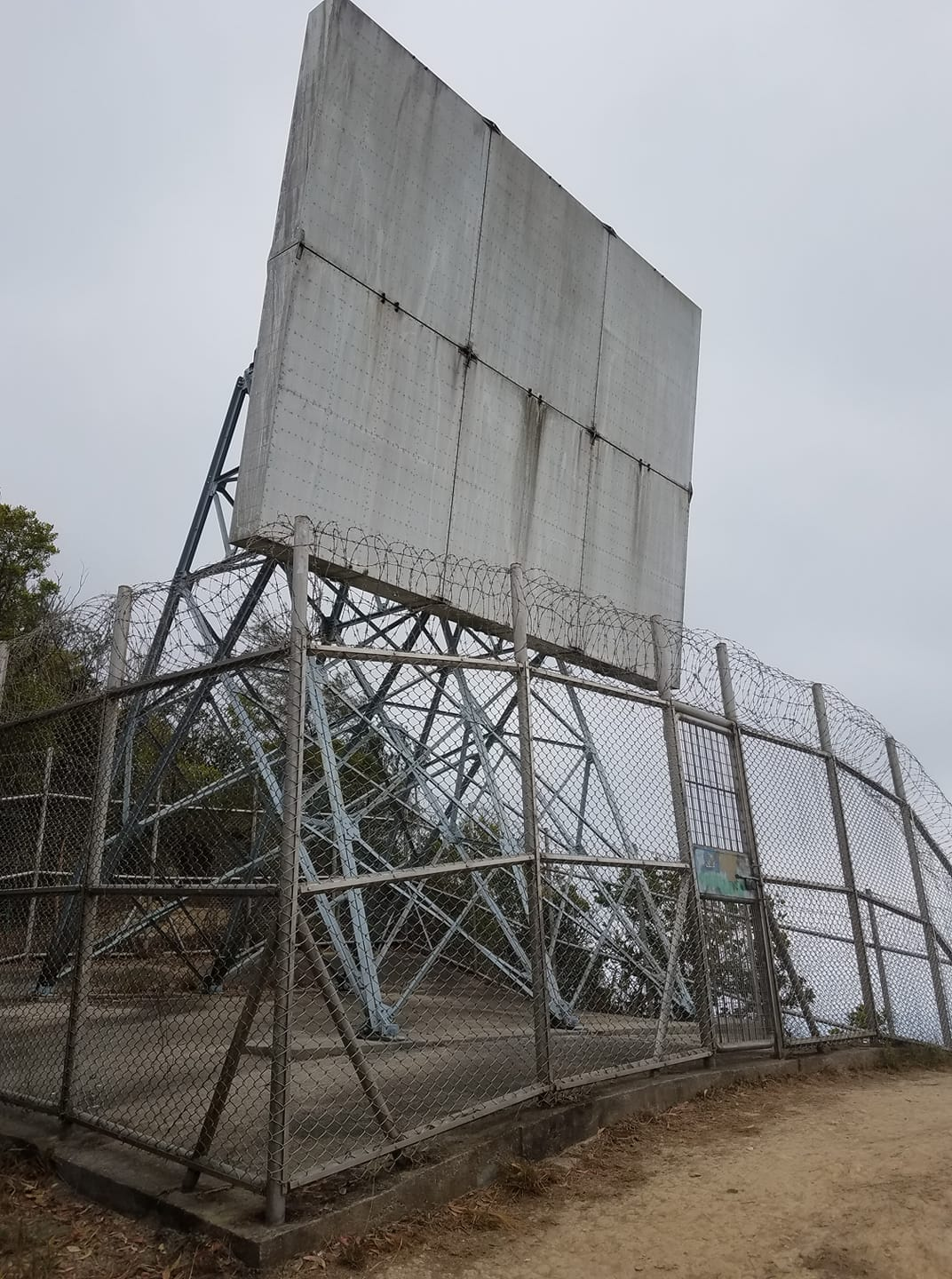
Closer view of one of the Passive Microwave repeaters on Black Hill, Hong Kong

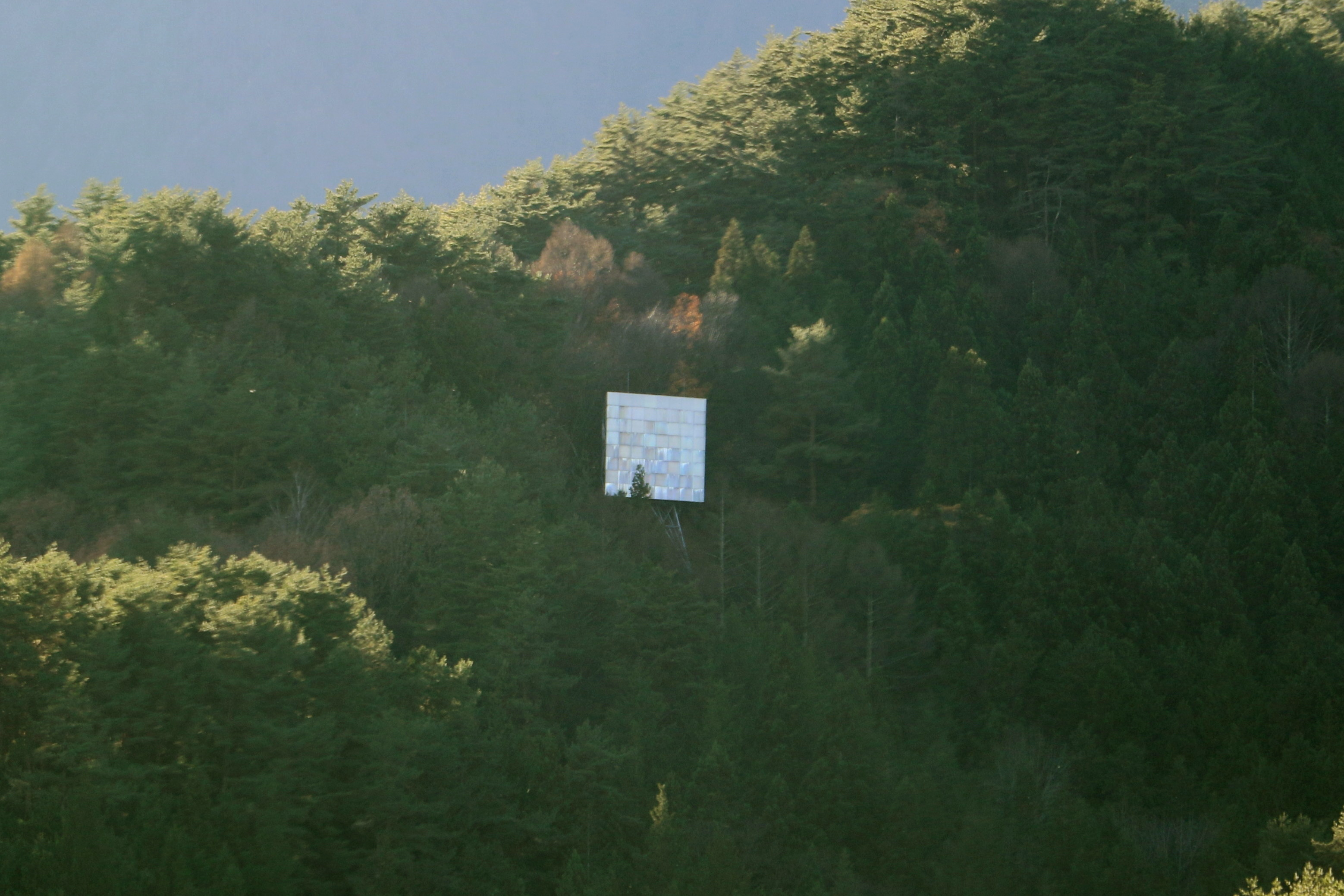
Passive Microwave repeater on a hill in Nagano, Japan
