= Black Hill, Hong Kong =

Hong Kong hill

Black Hill
- 五桂山
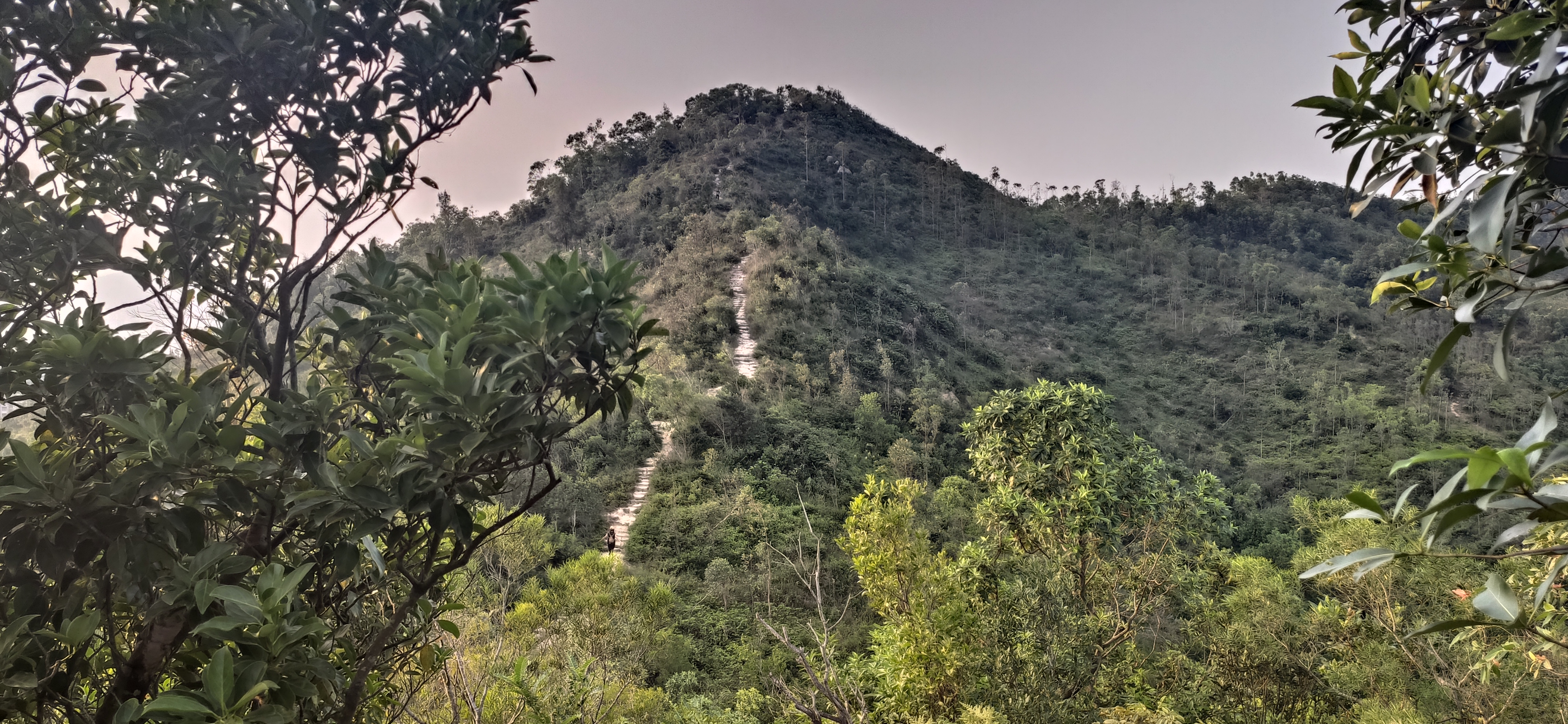
- One of Black Hill's summits

Highest point
- Elevation: 304 m (997 ft)
- Coordinates: 22°18′43.48″N 114°14′44.36″E

Geography
- Location within Hong Kong
- Location: Hong Kong

Black Hill (Chinese: 五桂山) is a hill in Hong Kong with a height of 304 metres. It is located between the communities of Lam Tin, Kowloon and Tiu Keng Leng, Sai Kung.

== Name ==
It is named for former administrator Major General Wilsone Black, a British Army officer in the 19th century.

== Geography ==
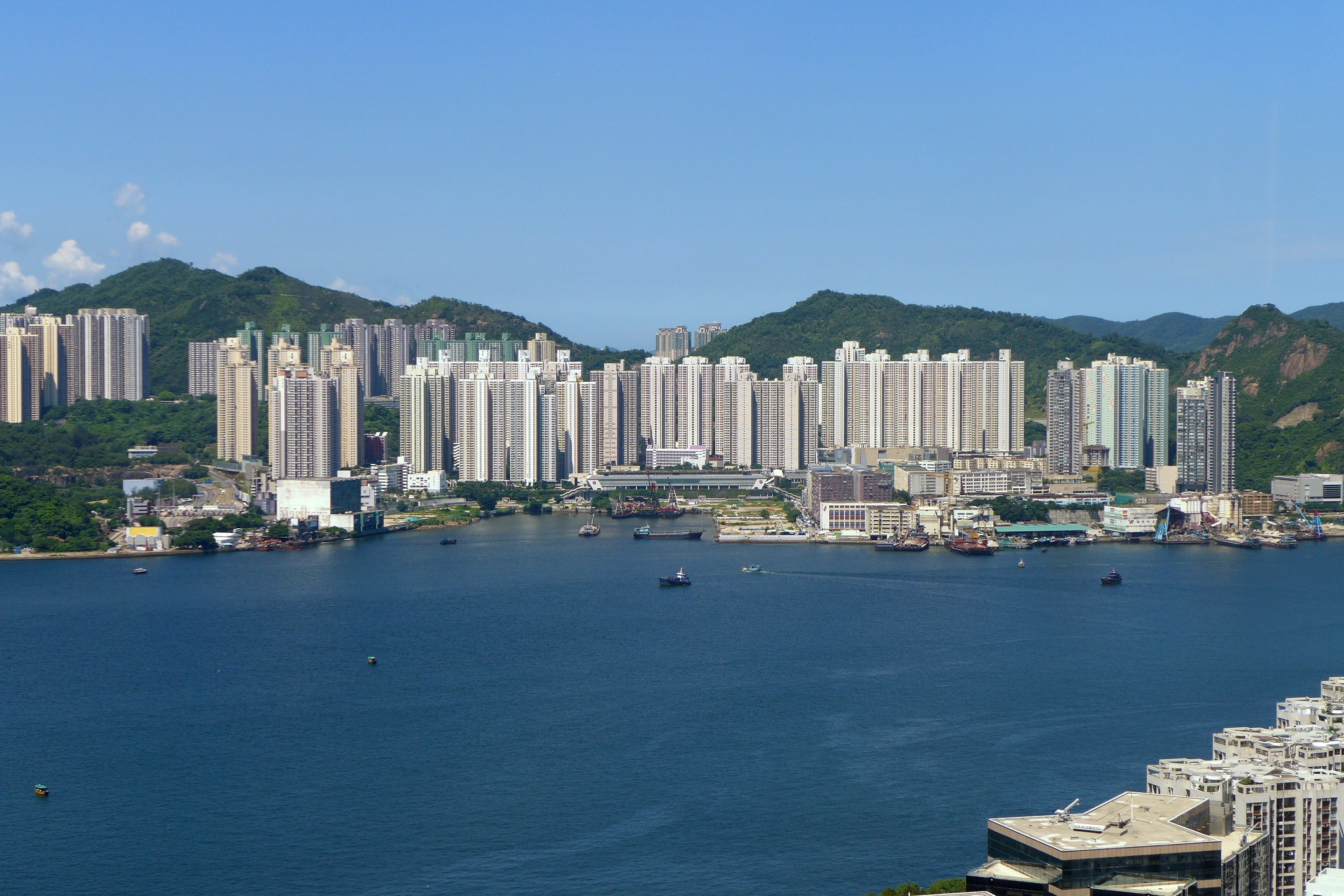
Left of middle are the three main peaks of Black Hill. Right of middle lies Chiu Keng Wan Shan. On the far right, Devil's Peak can be seen

Black Hill has several major peaks. It lies on the boundary between Kowloon and New Territories. To the south of Black Hill lies another hill called Chiu Keng Wan Shan. Parts of Lam Tin are built on the foot of Black Hill.

=== Access ===
There is no road access to the summit of this hill, so cars cannot reach the peak. A recent wildfire in December 2019 had made the trails on this mountain sandy and loose. A large part of the trail on this mountain is rocky and may not be suitable for beginning hikers.

It is possible to hike up the mountain from Lam Tin Park, passing through the Ma Yau Tong Central Sitting-out Area.

== Infrastructure ==
The Tseung Kwan O line of the Mass Transit Railway passes through tunnels below Black Hill to enter Tseung Kwan O New Town at Tiu Keng Leng (Rennie's Mill) from Yau Tong.

The Tseung Kwan O Tunnel connects Sau Mau Ping to Tsui Lam in the Tseung Kwan O area. Parts of the new Tseung Kwan O–Lam Tin Tunnel will also traverse this mountain.

== Murder in Black Hill ==
A 20-year-old enthusiast of outdoor activities became involved in a dispute with a friend over military equipment transactions. In May 2017, he was lured by the friend to Black Hill. where he was subsequently murdered. A 21-year-old individual was accused of assisting others in taking control of stolen goods and deleting data from the deceased's phone. The charges include attempting to obstruct justice and handling stolen goods. The case is currently under trial in the High Court.

Of the 4 defendants in this case, 1 was convicted of murder and 1 of manslaughter. An appeal against the conviction for murder was rejected in 2021.

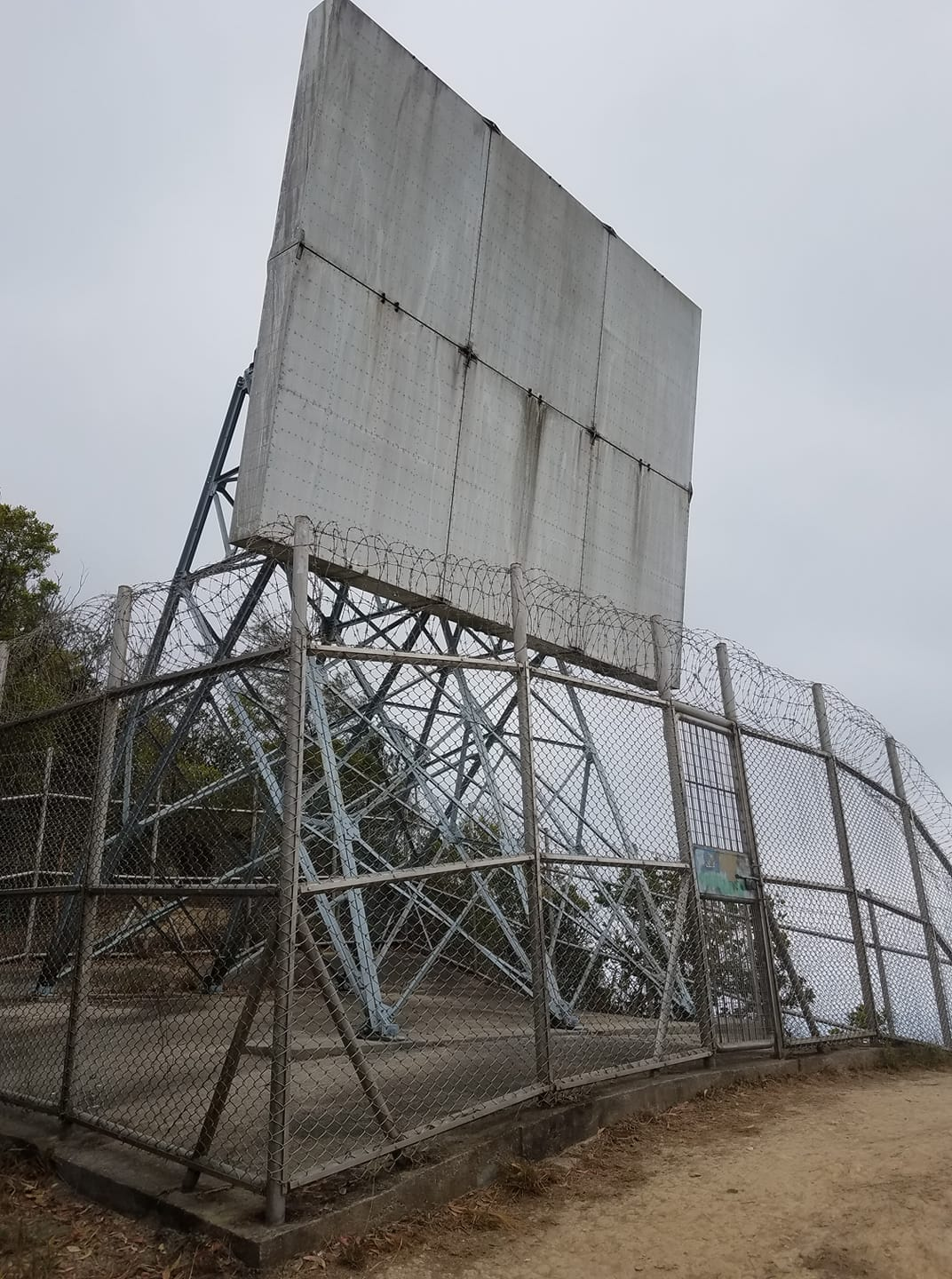
Microwave repeater on Black Hill

== See also ==
- List of mountains, peaks and hills in Hong Kong
- Tai Sheung Tok
- Wilson Trail
