= Mount Van Cott =

Mountain in the American state of Utah

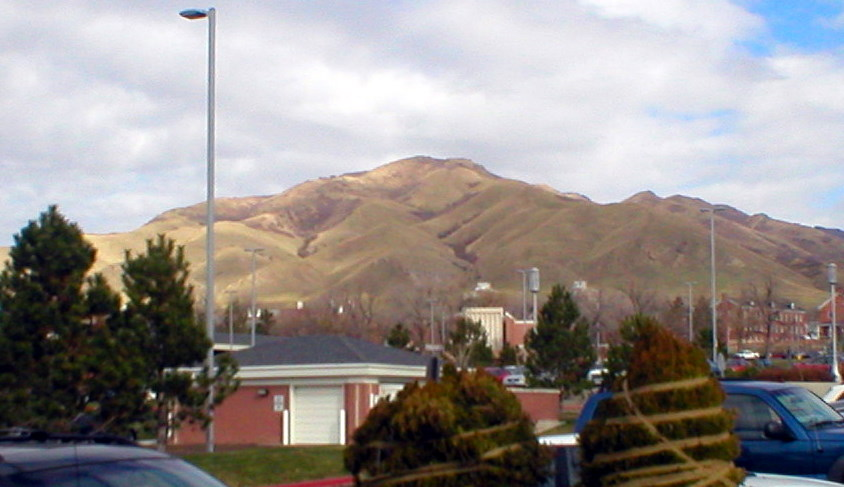
- Mount Van Cott from the University of Utah

Highest point
- Elevation: 6,351 ft (1,936 m) NAVD 88
- Prominence: 28 ft (8.5 m)
- Coordinates: 40°46′55″N 111°49′23″W

Geography
- Location within Utah
- Location: Salt Lake City, Utah
- Parent range: Wasatch Mountains

Climbing
- Easiest route: Hike

Mount Van Cott is a mountain located in the Wasatch Mountain Range immediately east of the University of Utah with an elevation of 6,351 feet (1,936 m). The mountain is a common spot for hikers as well as mountain bikers and has many access trails. The east side of the University of Utah offers direct access to trails to the summit. Most trails to the summit branch off of the Bonneville Shoreline Trail. The most obvious of these trails is a scar on the mountain that is located on its southwestern flank. The mountain is named after Lucy May Van Cott, the first dean of women (1907–1931) at the University of Utah and daughter of John Van Cott.

== Hiking ==
Like the adjacent mountains, hiking to the summit can be moderately difficult as the terrain is fairly unforgiving. Trails are not marked, but are in good condition, depending on which side a hiker climbs. Access from the west side of the mountain is often the easiest, as the trails are clearer.

== The summit ==
Once on the summit, the entire Salt Lake Valley can be seen from North Salt Lake to Point of the Mountain and Draper. To the north and west, Antelope Island is clearly visible, as is the entire Oquirrh mountain range. To the south and east, portions of the Wasatch Range can be seen, especially the mountain's neighbor, Mount Wire.

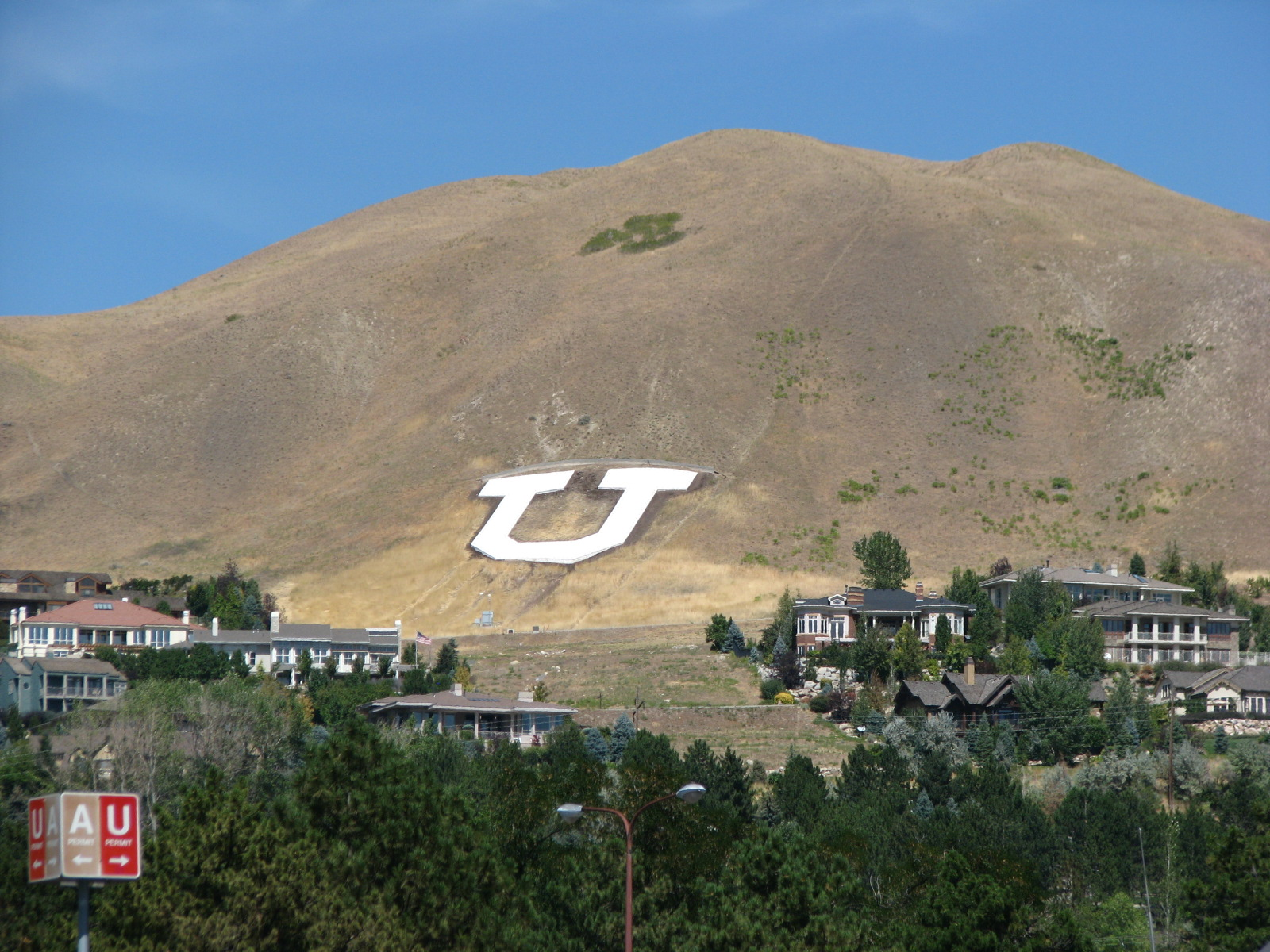
The "Block U" has overlooked the University of Utah since 1907.
