= Pryke & Palmer =

Ironmongers and builders' merchants, of London, England

Pryke & Palmer Ltd.
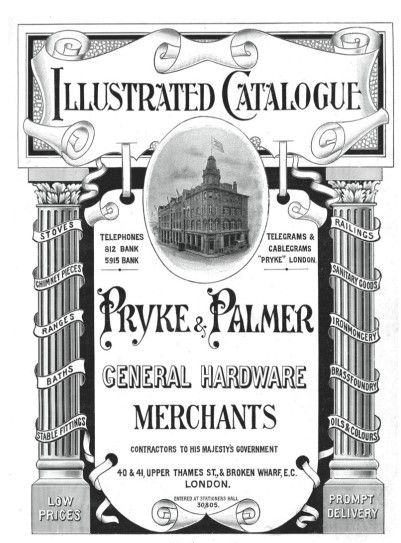
- Catalogue cover design, circa 1880
- Company type: Limited company
- Industry: Hardware
- Headquarters: Upper Thames Street, London, England
- Products: Biidling supplies; ironware

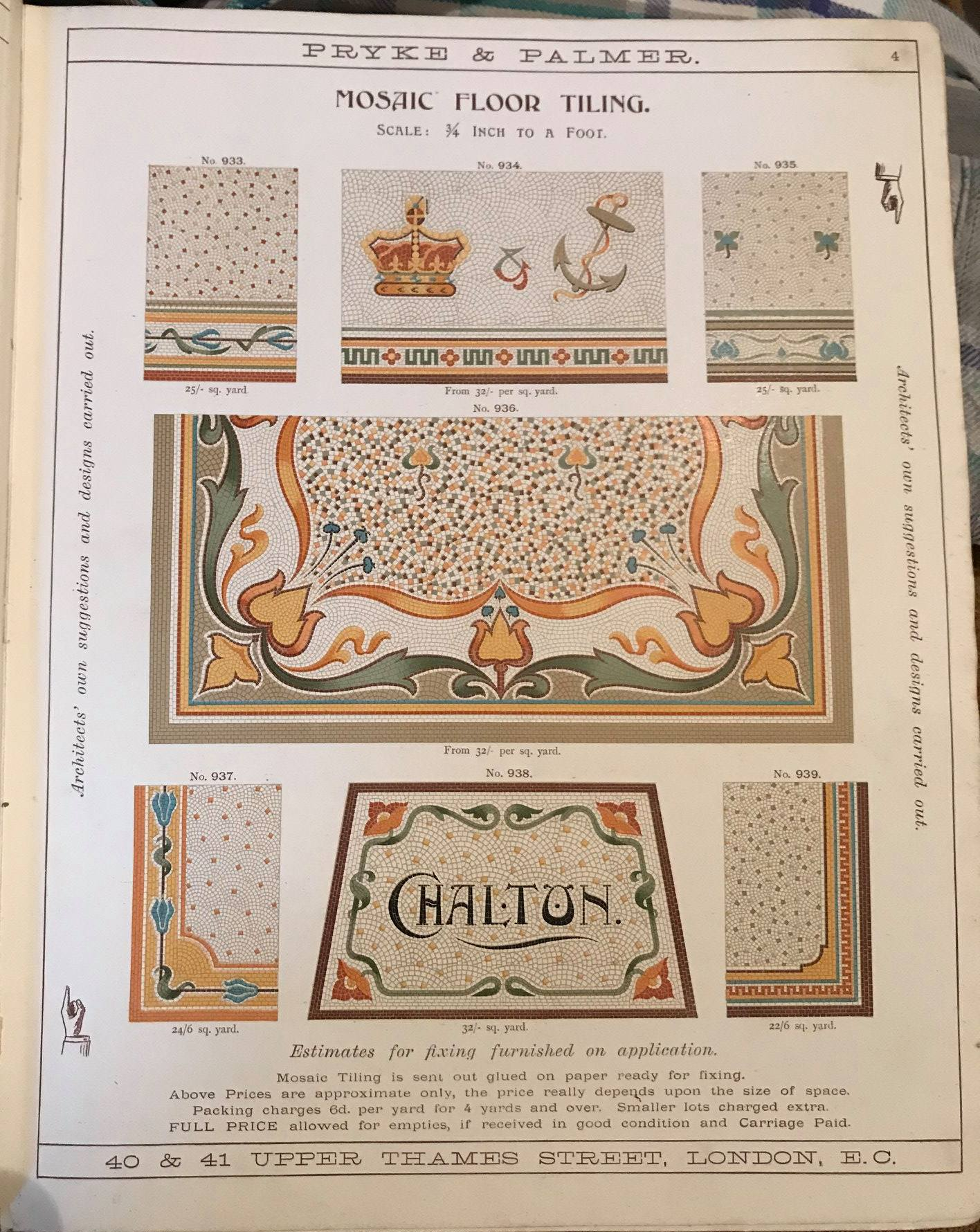
Advert for mosaic floor tiles, from a circa 1900 catalogue

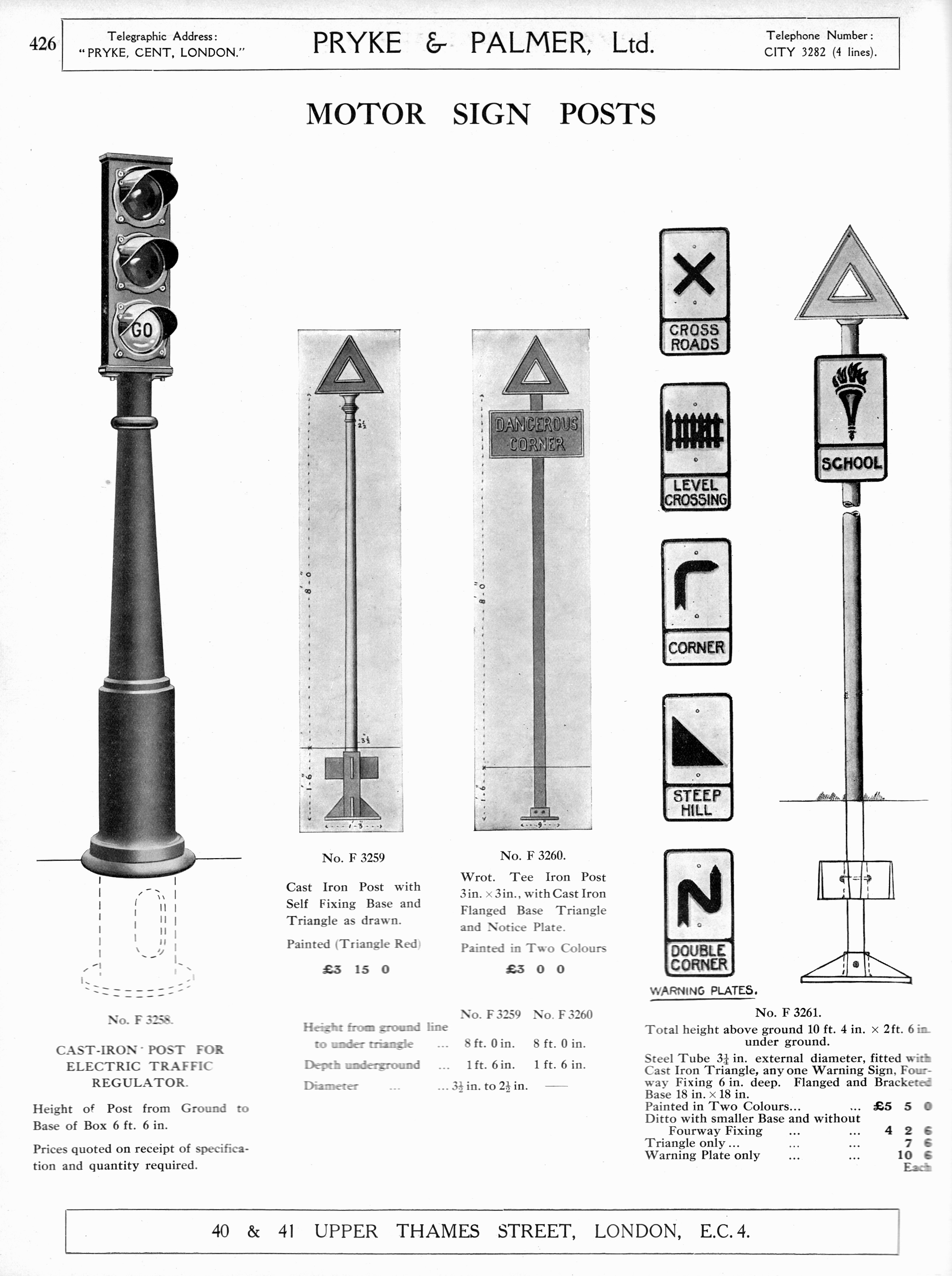
"Motor Sign Posts" in a 1930 catalogue

Pryke & Palmer Ltd. was a company of ironmongers and builders' merchants, in the City of London, England. Their illustrated and extensive catalogues (a 1 November 1894 edition in Australia's Caroline Simpson Library has 782 pages) have become sought after by collectors, with some reproduced in facsimile editions.

In 1925 the company's Chairman, William Robert Pryke (1847-1932), served as Lord Mayor of London and was subsequently created a Baronet. His son, Dudley Pryke (1882–1959), later 2nd Baronet, spent his entire life working for the firm, rising to be managing director.

Their catalogues show them as located at 40 & 41, Upper Thames Street, London E.C. 4. They also had premises at Broken Wharf, in the Port of London, nearby. By 1930, they had showrooms on Newman Street/Oxford Street, in central London.

== Products ==
An idea of the vast range of products made or stocked by Pryke & Palmer can be gleaned from their 807-page "Catalogue of General Hardware", circa 1920, held by the Museum of English Rural Life:

- baby carriages and invalid carriages
- barometers
- bathroom accessories
- baths, basins and closet suites
- bell fittings
- bicycles
- blow lamps
- boilers and hot water pipes
- bolts and nails
- braces and drills
- bricklayers', plasterers', slaters' and glaziers' tools
- brushes
- buckets
- builders' accessories
- carpenters' tools
- ceiling centres
- cisterns
- coachbuilders' ironmongery
- coal bunkers
- coal vases
- coffee mills
- coffin furniture
- constructional ironwork
- cramps and vices
- curtain and picture fittings
- door and window furniture
- drain cleaning and testing equipment
- drilling machines
- dustbins
- electric light fittings
- electric wire and motors
- fancy glass
- fire brigade equipment
- firescreens
- floor, wall and fireside tiles
- flour bins
- food choppers
- forges
- fountains
- furniture
- garden accessories
- garden rollers
- garden seats and tables
- gas burners and pendants
- grindstones
- hammers
- hinges
- hobs and grates
- hollow ware
- hooks
- household articles
- iron gates and railings
- kerbs and mantel pieces
- lawn mowers
- leaded lights
- lifting tackle
- locks
- measuring equipment
- metals
- money registers
- morticing, boring and tenoning machines
- nameplates
- nuts
- oil colour and varnish
- paint accessories
- paperhangers' equipment
- picks and shovels
- pipes
- planes
- plumbers' and tinmens' tools
- printing equipment
- pulleys
- pumps
- radiators
- ranges and cooking stoves
- refrigerators
- road lamps
- road making equipment
- safes, strong room doors and cash boxes
- saws
- scissors, cutlery and electroplated articles
- sewing machines
- shop window fittings
- slate, marble, iron and wood chimney pieces
- sliding door gear
- stable fittings and requisites
- steam fittings
- stencilling equipment
- stoves
- taps and cocks
- telephones
- thermometers
- tools
- trunks and cases
- umbrella stands
- ventilators and drain covers
- washing machines
- water pails
- weighing machines
- wheelbarrows
