= Lester Wire =

American traffic light inventor (1887–1958)

- Wire at his high school graduation, circa 1908
- Born: Lester Farnsworth Wire; September 3, 1887; Salt Lake City, Utah, U.S.
- Died: April 14, 1958 (aged 70); Salt Lake City, Utah, U.S.
- Resting place: Salt Lake City Cemetery; 40°46′37.92″N 111°51′28.8″W
- Known for: Inventor of the electric traffic light

Lester Farnsworth Wire (September 3, 1887 – April 14, 1958) was an American police officer and inventor. He is credited with the invention of the electric traffic light in 1912.

A native of Salt Lake City, Utah, Wire worked as a traffic officer and later as a detective for the Salt Lake City Police Department (SLCPD). His first traffic light, a manually operated wooden model, was built while he was head of the SLCPD's Traffic Bureau and installed in downtown Salt Lake City in 1912. Though Wire's traffic light was originally viewed with curiosity and disapproval, the public gradually accepted it over time, and by the 1920s Salt Lake City had developed an automated traffic light system inspired by Wire's invention. Wire continued to work on traffic light designs throughout his life, and later fully redesigned his traffic light using a metal frame.

Wire never patented his traffic lights, and by the 1960s both of the original models had been lost. However, his work played a significant role in the development and adoption of the traffic light in the United States. Replicas of Wire's traffic lights have been built since the loss of the originals, and his contributions to traffic management are memorialized by the Utah Department of Transportation (UDOT).

== Early life ==
Lester Wire was born on September 3, 1887, in Salt Lake City, Utah, to Frank and Lida Wire. He had three sisters: Ora, Zelta, and Edith. He and his family were Mormons. In 1897, Lester and his sisters became sick with diphtheria, but Frank and Lida, believers in Christian Science, believed the best treatment for their children's illness was prayer, and did not have them seek treatment or self-quarantine; Frank would also later claim he believed they were only stricken with mumps. When 4-year-old Ora and 8-year-old Zelta died of their illnesses, a controversy erupted, and Frank was ultimately charged with manslaughter.

Wire attended Salt Lake High School, where he was a football star and helped create the first high school men's and women's basketball teams. In 1909, he was enrolled in the University of Utah as a law student, but found it too expensive and quit to become a police officer like his father.

== Career and invention ==
Wire joined the Salt Lake City Police Department in 1910. An expert marksman, he competed in marksmanship competitions as part of the SLCPD's "revolver team", and was well-regarded by his fellow officers.

In 1912, Wire was appointed as sergeant of the SLCPD's Traffic Bureau, the department's first traffic enforcement unit, at the age of 24 by Chief B. F. Grant. In that position, Wire created the first traffic codes in Salt Lake City, although the public was divided on accepting them. He also managed the officers sent to respond to traffic incidents and direct traffic at the city's busy intersections. The officers would stand on small platforms in the middle of each intersection, and would direct and time traffic each way. However, automobile traffic in this era was very chaotic and dangerous: motorists could drive however they pleased and could turn or stop wherever they wanted, and pedestrians in the street were "fair game" if they did not move out of their way fast enough. Though the traffic light had been invented decades earlier in 1868 by J. P. Knight in London, England, that semaphore-based system was not a success and had actually killed the police officers operating it in an explosion, and no cities in Utah, if not the entire United States, had any operating traffic light systems. Concerned about his officers' working conditions (they would have to stand in the middle of the road for long hours even in inclement weather), and realizing traffic and intersections in the city would continue to outnumber and overwhelm anyone trying to manage them alone, Wire sought to devise a better and safer way to control traffic. With Matthew 5:15 as his inspiration ("Neither do men light a candle, and put it under a bushel, but on a candlestick; and it giveth light unto all"), Wire envisioned the electric traffic signal.

Wire's first prototype was a yellow wooden box with a pitched roof that contained red and green lights on all four sides. Wire dipped the bulbs in red and green paint to get their color as opposed to using colored glass; these colors were chosen for familiarity, as they were already being used for similar purposes as nautical lights and railway signals. The traffic light was mounted to a 10-foot pole, wired to the electrical lines of the city's trolley system, and hand-operated by a police officer in a booth at the side of the road. It was installed at the intersection of Main Street and 200 South in downtown Salt Lake City in 1912. Because it strongly resembled a birdhouse, the traffic light was nicknamed "Wire's bird cage", "Wire's pigeon house", and the "flashing bird house", among other names.

Public reaction to the new traffic light was mixed, with many viewing it as either a curiosity or a nuisance: motorists unfamiliar with the traffic light simply chose to ignore it; pedestrians would gather just to watch it operate and derisively pretend it contained or was operated by birds; officers would often find the traffic light had been knocked over and damaged overnight; and even the city commission consistently and deliberately ignored his requests to install additional traffic lights. However, it became apparent over time that Wire's traffic light was an invaluable tool, and more motorists became used to the presence of traffic lights on Salt Lake City's roads, while local companies, seeing an untapped market in the new invention, began producing traffic lights of their own. In 1914, Wire's traffic light was redesigned to replace the booth with a "coop" mounted to a pole; this otherwise had the same function as the booth. In 1926, the city introduced the "iron mike" system, automating the traffic light's operation. Wire's original traffic light was eventually retired and removed from the intersection of Main and 200 South at an unknown date, replaced by successors with newer features such as amber caution lights and automatic timers.

Wire enlisted in the American Expeditionary Forces in 1917 as an ambulance driver, survived World War I, and returned to Salt Lake City in 1919, by which point many other American cities had also adopted traffic lights of their own. He attempted to regain his position in the SLCPD as the Traffic Bureau's sergeant, but the officer who took his position did not wish to give it up, so Wire instead returned to regular patrol and, on January 8, 1920, joined the Detective Bureau. As a detective, Wire helped solve about 43 murder cases. Despite no longer being in the Traffic Bureau, Wire continued to improve on his traffic light designs, and eventually created a more durable metal traffic light that less resembled a birdhouse, using a smokestack salvaged from an old locomotive for the frame. During World War II, Wire did not serve in the military, but was the chief coordinator of civilian protection in Salt Lake City on the American home front. Wire retired from policing in 1946.

Wire did not file a patent for his electric traffic light after inventing it, though he reportedly considered doing so. Why he did not do so is unclear, though it has been suggested that his police duties, and later his service during World War I, prevented him from finding the time to do so. By the time he did try to file a patent later in his life, it had been too long since his original invention, and he was unable to patent it per United States Patent and Trademark Office regulations; thus, Wire never earned any money for his invention.

== Death and legacy ==
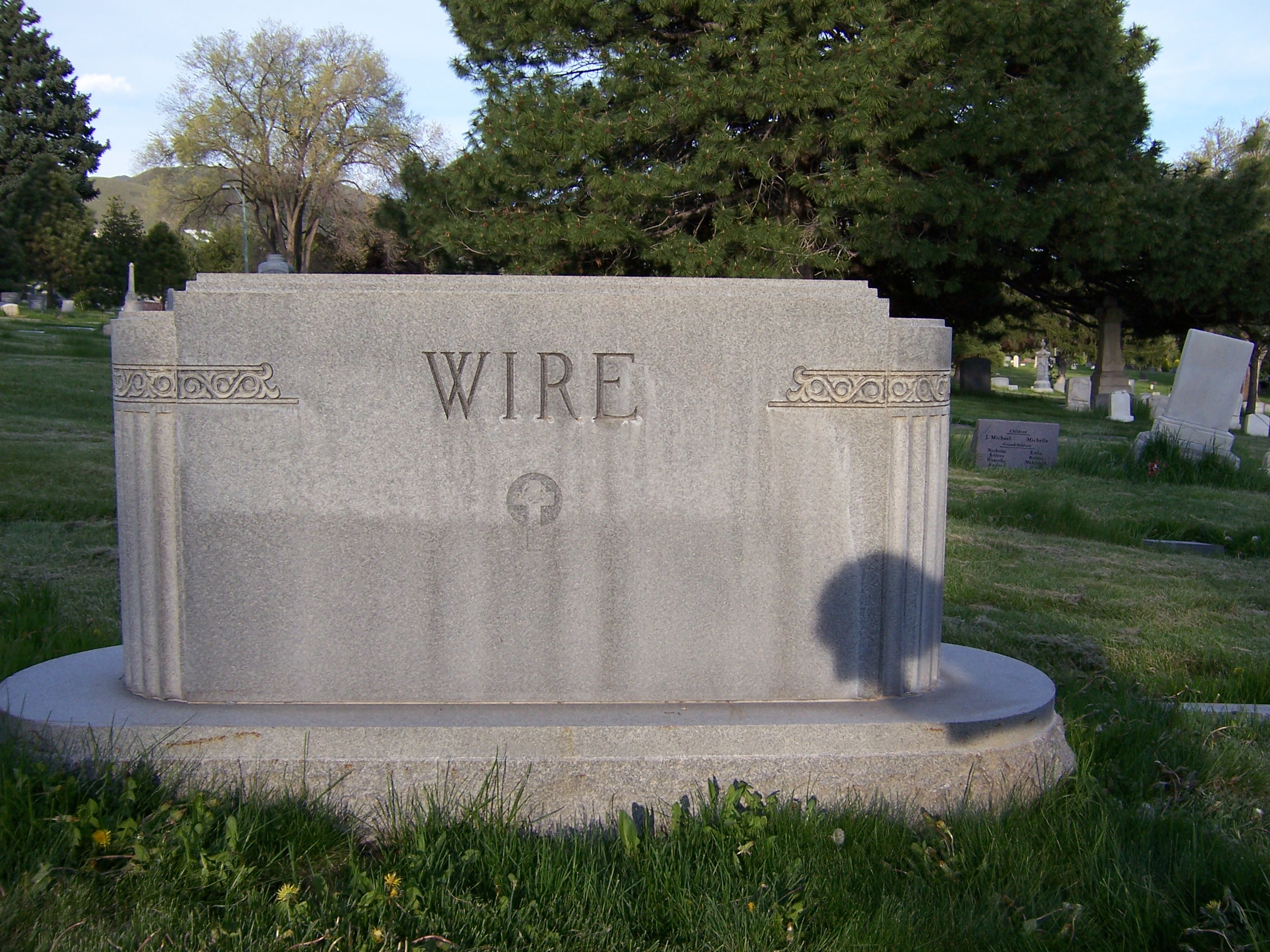
The front of Wire's grave at the Salt Lake City Cemetery

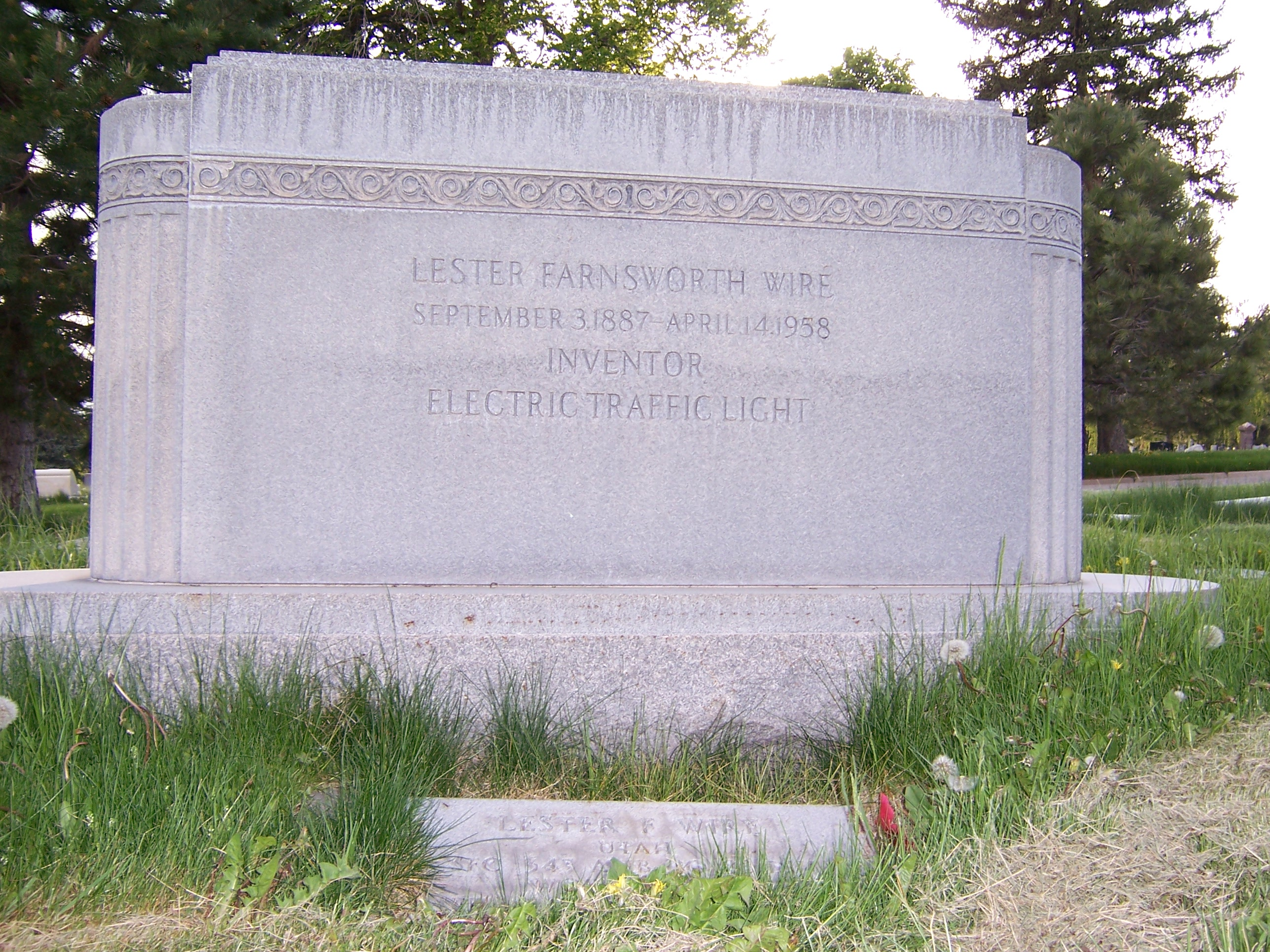
The rear of Wire's grave, identifying him as the inventor of the electric traffic light

Wire died of a heart attack on April 14, 1958, at the age of 70. He was not married. Wire was buried at Salt Lake City Cemetery.

Eight years after Wire's invention, in Detroit, Michigan, Detroit Police Department Detective William Potts introduced the amber light and a series of electrical controls that would ultimately result in the automatic traffic light. Like Wire, Potts did not apply for a patent. The first inventor of a traffic light to do so was Garrett Morgan, who in 1923 patented his invention of a three-way traffic light with "STOP" and "GO" signals, as well as a third signal for pedestrians. Morgan eventually sold his patent to General Electric, which began mass-producing traffic lights.

In March 1963, the Wire Memorial Museum and Historical Association was started in his family home. His sister, Edith Wire, tried to secure the original wooden traffic light from the Tracy Aviary, where it had been used as a birdhouse, but it had disappeared shortly after Lester's death and was never recovered. The original metal traffic light had been moved to Syracuse, New York, where it was put on display; however, when Edith sent a letter to its owners asking that it be returned to Salt Lake City, they replied that they had coincidentally disposed of it two days before her letter arrived. When Edith died in 1973, she left her inheritance to keep the Wire Memorial Museum operating, but they had insufficient funding; trustees for the estate referred the problem to the courts, and the Utah Department of Transportation agreed to use the estate's assets to properly memorialize Wire for his contributions to traffic management.

The UDOT Traffic Operations Center at 2060 South 2760 West in Salt Lake City includes the Lester Farnsworth Wire Memorial Library, and a replica of Wire's original wooden traffic light is displayed in the center.
