= Railway Mission =

Christian organization

Railway Mission logo

National Rail Chaplaincy Service logo

The Railway Mission is a British mission devoted to the rail industry. It was founded in 1881 based in mission halls, and now operates a chaplaincy service. In the early days of the Railway Mission there were a number of mission halls at railway stations throughout the country, including one at Bury St Edmunds, completed in 1900, and a 1906 building at Salisbury. An example of a Railway Mission chapel separate from a station is to be found at Norwich, at what is now Prince of Wales Road Evangelical Church.

The present-day Railway Mission is a care provider to the rail industry and British Transport Police through the provision of the National Rail Chaplaincy Service (NRCS). Operating in partnership with London City Mission, the Railway Mission is the principal partner in the NRCS which provides around 25 mainly full-time chaplains to the railways, enabling pastoral care across the whole of the mainland UK railway network.

== Overview ==
The British Railway Mission was founded in 1881 to communicate the Christian Gospel to the people working in the railway and associated industries. The railway industry has undergone dramatic changes over the years, but those who work throughout the modern network continue to face many challenges and problems in the 21st century.

The Mission's founding objective was "the moral and spiritual advancement of railway employees of all ages". That objective is still the driving force of the Mission as it seeks to provide independent confidential help and support to any rail industry employee, whether active or retired, at home, hospital or workplace.

For more than a century successive railway managements from board to local level have given much encouragement to the work of the Railway Mission. As well as support from the railways themselves the Railway Mission relies on funding from individual donations to finance its continuing work and expansion of the network of chaplains.

== Pastoral care ==
"Meeting People... Meeting Needs..." is the strap line for the work of the mission. Marriage breakdown, domestic upheaval, serious illness, bereavement, alcohol and drug dependency can all be deeply distressing and affect not only the quality of the life of the person concerned but also their families and colleagues. Increasing stress may be experienced as the rail industry develops in the 21st century. The work of the chaplains complements that of the welfare services offered by employers. Together we seek to ensure that all employees receive the pastoral care that they need. The Railway Mission is a 7-day a week, 24 hours a day service – just like the rail industry itself. The Mission's chaplains are called to emergency situations and can be relied upon to give careful, meaningful help and advice.

== International Railway Mission ==
The International Railway Mission (IRM) is an interdenominational federation which connects Christian fellowships with rail staff all over Europe. IRM holds a conference every three years, where the members and supporters of the Railway Missions can exchange experiences and enjoy fellowship with other participants.

=== Countries ===
- Austria: Gemeinschaft Gläubiger Eisenbahner Österreichs
- Germany: Christliche Vereinigung Deutscher Eisenbahner – Eisenbahnermission (CVDE)
- Great Britain: British Railway Mission (BRM)
- Nederland: Nederlands Netwerk van Christenen in die Spoorwegbranche (NNCS)
- Switzerland: Evangelisch christliches Verkehrspersonal der Schweiz (ECV)
- United States: Railroad Evangelistic Association
- Finland: Railway Mission of Finland

== See also ==
- Media related to Railway Mission halls in the United Kingdom at Wikimedia Commons
