= J. P. Knight =

English railway manager and inventor (1828–1886)

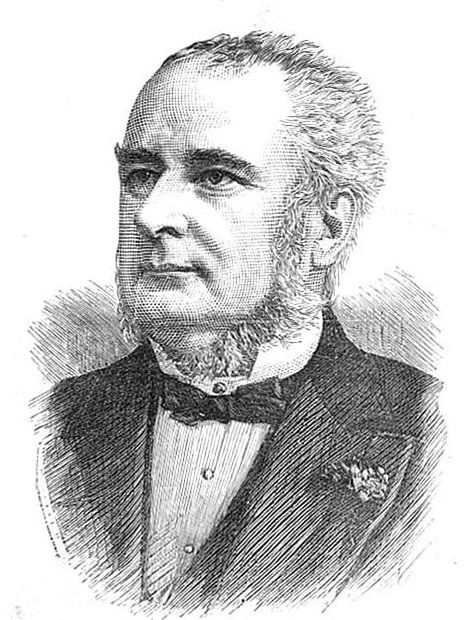
- John Peake Knight Inventor of the Traffic light
- Born: John Peake Knight; 13 January 1828; Nottingham, England
- Died: 23 July 1886 (aged 58)
- Resting place: Brompton Cemetery
- Education: Nottingham High School
- Spouse: Elizabeth Knight (1832–1913)
- Children: 5
- Engineering career
- Employer(s): South Eastern Railway (England), London, Brighton & South Coast Railway
- Projects: first traffic light
- Awards: Legion of Honour, 1878

John Peake Knight (13 January 1828 – 23 July 1886) was an English railway manager and inventor, credited with inventing the traffic light in 1868.

== Biography ==
Knight was born in Nottingham and attended Nottingham High School. His elementary school is unknown.

He left school at the age of 12 to work in the parcel room of Derby railway station. Knight was promoted quickly and by the age of 20 had joined the South Eastern Railway, rising to the rank of Superintendent. He was appointed Traffic Manager for the London to Brighton Line in 1869 and General Manager the following year. He did a great deal to improve the quality of railway travel on the railway, introducing the Westinghouse air brake, safer carriages with communication cords, electric lighting, and Pullman cars.

He and his wife, Elizabeth, had five sons. The eldest founded J P Knight Ltd., a tugboat operator.

Knight died in 1886. The Prince of Wales had a special wreath placed on his coffin during the funeral. He is buried in Brompton Cemetery in London.

== Invention of traffic lights ==
In 1866, a year in which 1,102 people were killed and 1,334 injured on roads in London, Knight proposed a signalling system to regulate horse-drawn traffic and reduce the number of road accidents. Knight's invention was operated by a policeman and used a semaphore system based on railway signalling during the day, and red and green gas-powered lamps at night.

The world's first traffic light was installed on 9 December 1868 in London near Westminster Bridge, at the intersection of Great George Street and Bridge Street, London SW1. However, in 1869, a gas leak caused one of the lights to explode, badly injuring the policeman operating it, and the system fell out of favour and was removed as a result. Traffic lights did not appear again in the United Kingdom until 1929, when the first electric signals were introduced in London.

A memorial plaque to Knight's invention can be seen at 12 Bridge Street, Westminster, the corner building close to where the original traffic lights were erected. Minister for Roads and Road Safety Baroness Hayman unveiled the plaque on 4 March 1998. There is also a memorial plaque to Knight inside what is now Calvary Evangelical Church in Brighton, but which at the time of his death was a Primitive Methodist chapel.

== See also ==
- Lester Wire – American inventor of the electric traffic light
