= Laguna City =

Private housing estate in Kowloon, Hong Kong

- 麗港城
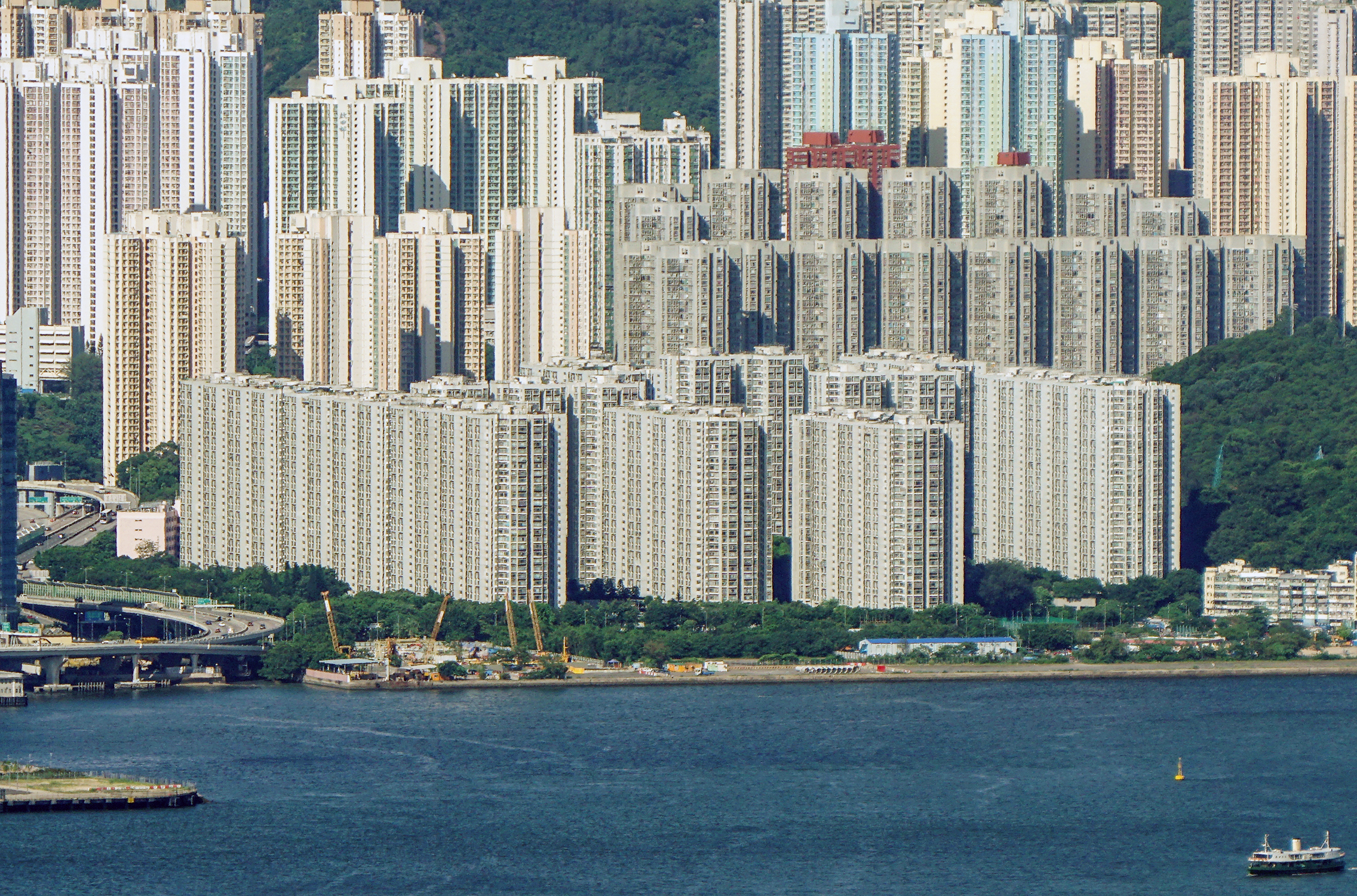
- Laguna City, in 2018
- Interactive map of the Laguna City area

General information
- Status: Completed
- Type: Residential
- Location: 99 Cha Kwo Ling Road; Sai Tso Wan, Kowloon, Hong Kong
- Coordinates: 22.30599°N 114.22767°E
- Completed: Block 1-7, 13-16: December 1990; Block 24-31: May 1991; Block 8, 17: December 1991; Block 32-38: February 1992; Block 9, 18: May 1993; Block 10-12, 19-23: December 1994
- Operator: Citybase Property Management Ltd. (wholly owned subsidiary of Cheung Kong (Holdings) Limited)

Technical details
- Floor count: 25-28

Design and construction
- Developer: Cheung Kong Holdings, Shell & Hutchison Whampoa Property

Other information
- Number of rooms: 8072

Laguna City
- Traditional Chinese: 麗港城
- Simplified Chinese: 丽港城
- Literal meaning: Beautiful Harbour City
Transcriptions
Standard Mandarin
- Hanyu Pinyin: Lí Gǎng Chéng
Yue: Cantonese
- Jyutping: lai6 gong2 sing4

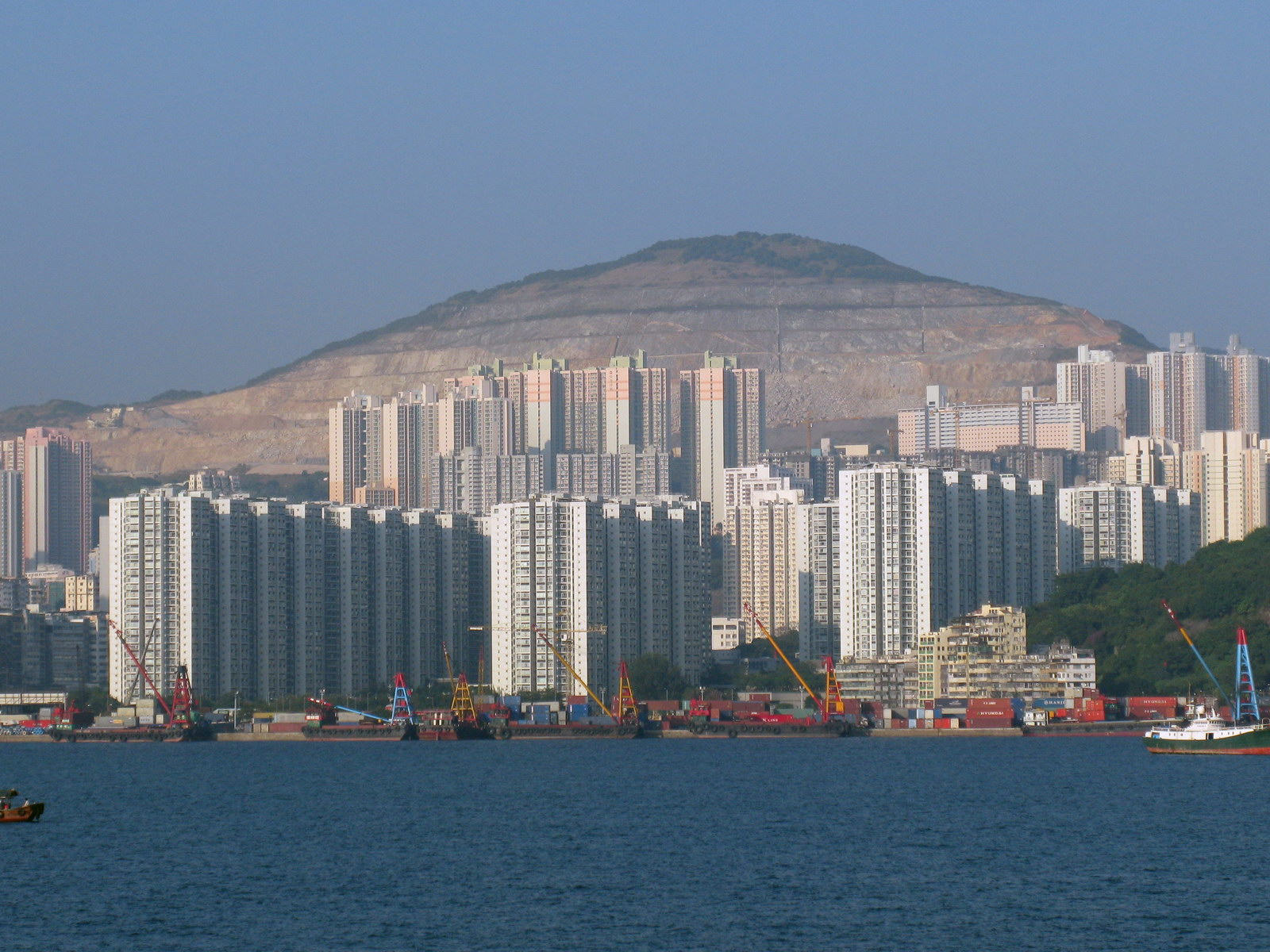
Laguna City, facing Victoria Harbour. The hill in the background is Tai Sheung Tok.

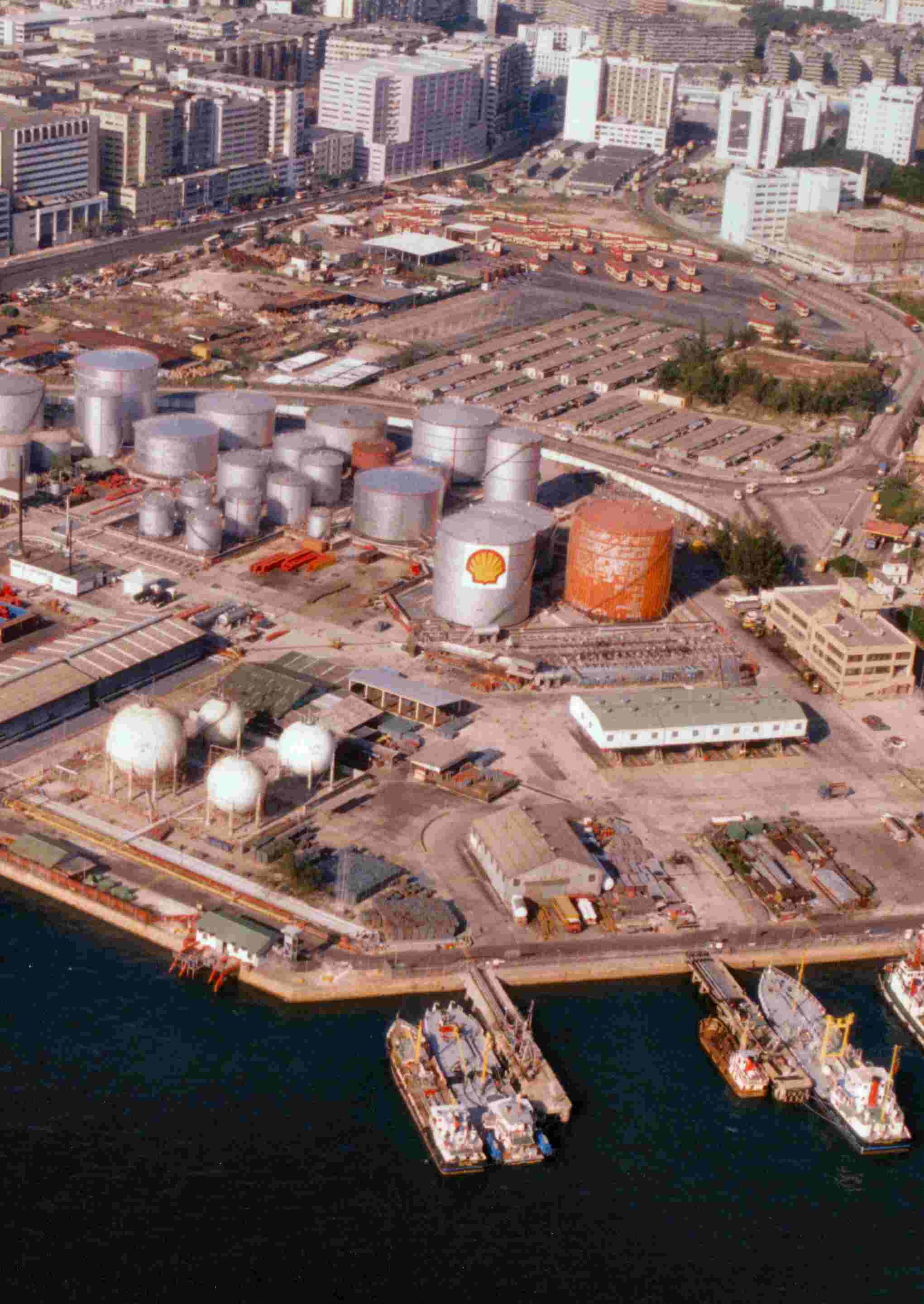
Former Shell oil depot, on the site of today's Laguna City.

Laguna City (Chinese: 麗港城) is a large-scale private-housing estates built in Sai Tso Wan, Kwun Tong District, in eastern Kowloon, Hong Kong. It was developed jointly by Cheung Kong Holdings and Hutchison Whampoa Property and completed in the early 1990s.

== Location ==
Laguna City is built along Lam Tin's waterfront. Part of Laguna City is built on reclaimed land. The development is adjacent to Cha Kwo Ling Village, one of the last squatter villages in Hong Kong.

== History ==
In the late 1980s, Cheung Kong acquired two pieces of land in Lam Tin, one being a former Shell oil depot, now the Laguna City, the other above the newly built Lam Tin MTR station and bus terminus, which was developed into the Sceneway Garden respectively. Laguna City was completed in 1991 and Sceneway Garden was completed in 1992.

== Description ==
Laguna City consists of four phases, totalling 38 towers at its 1991 completion. There are 3 private roads in Laguna City, which are Laguna Street in phase 1 and 4, Laguna Street East in phase 2 and Laguna Street South in phase 3. Phases 1, 2 and 4 of Laguna City are managed by the same company, while phase 3 has an independent management authority. Similarly, Phases 1, 2 and 4 share an owners' committee, whereas Phase 3 has its own. Census data indicate that Laguna City had a population of 22,319 in 2021.

Built together with Laguna City was Laguna Park, which was completed in 1994 and then handed over to the Urban Council, now the Leisure and Cultural Services Department. Laguna Park has a total area of 30,000 sq m (320,000 ft^{2}).

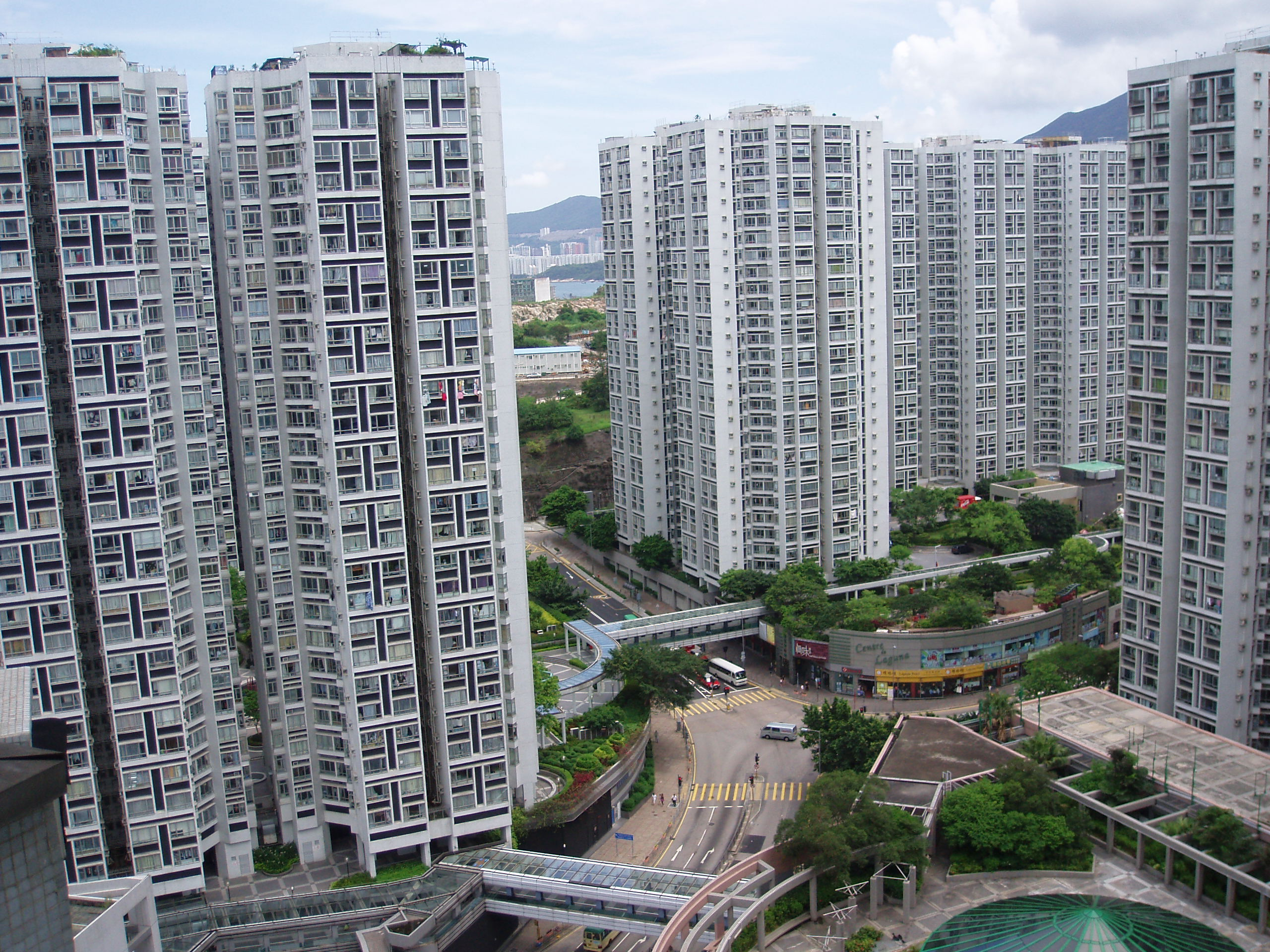
Phase 2 & 3, Laguna City with Victoria Harbour background.

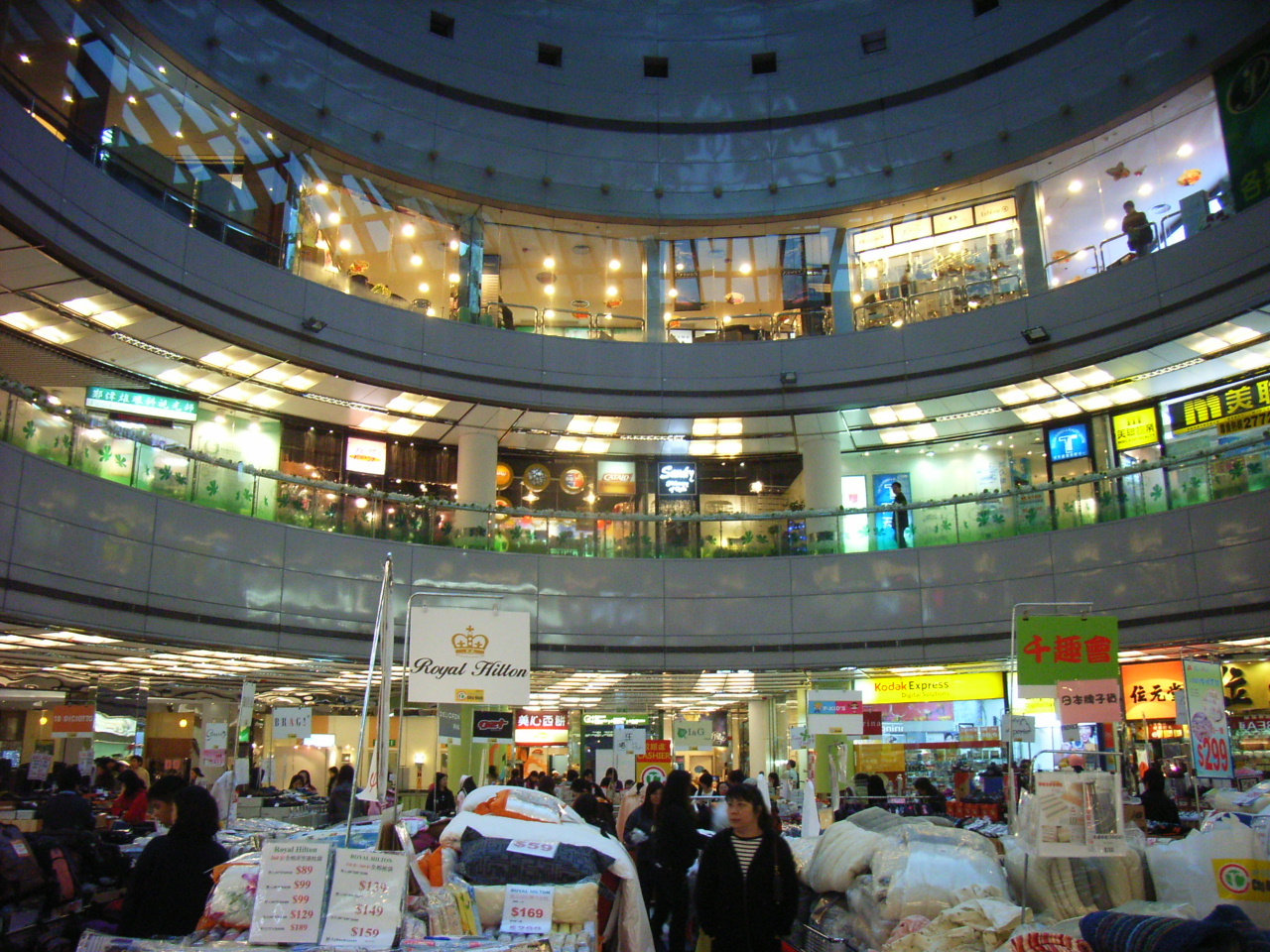
Interior of the Laguna Plaza shopping centre.

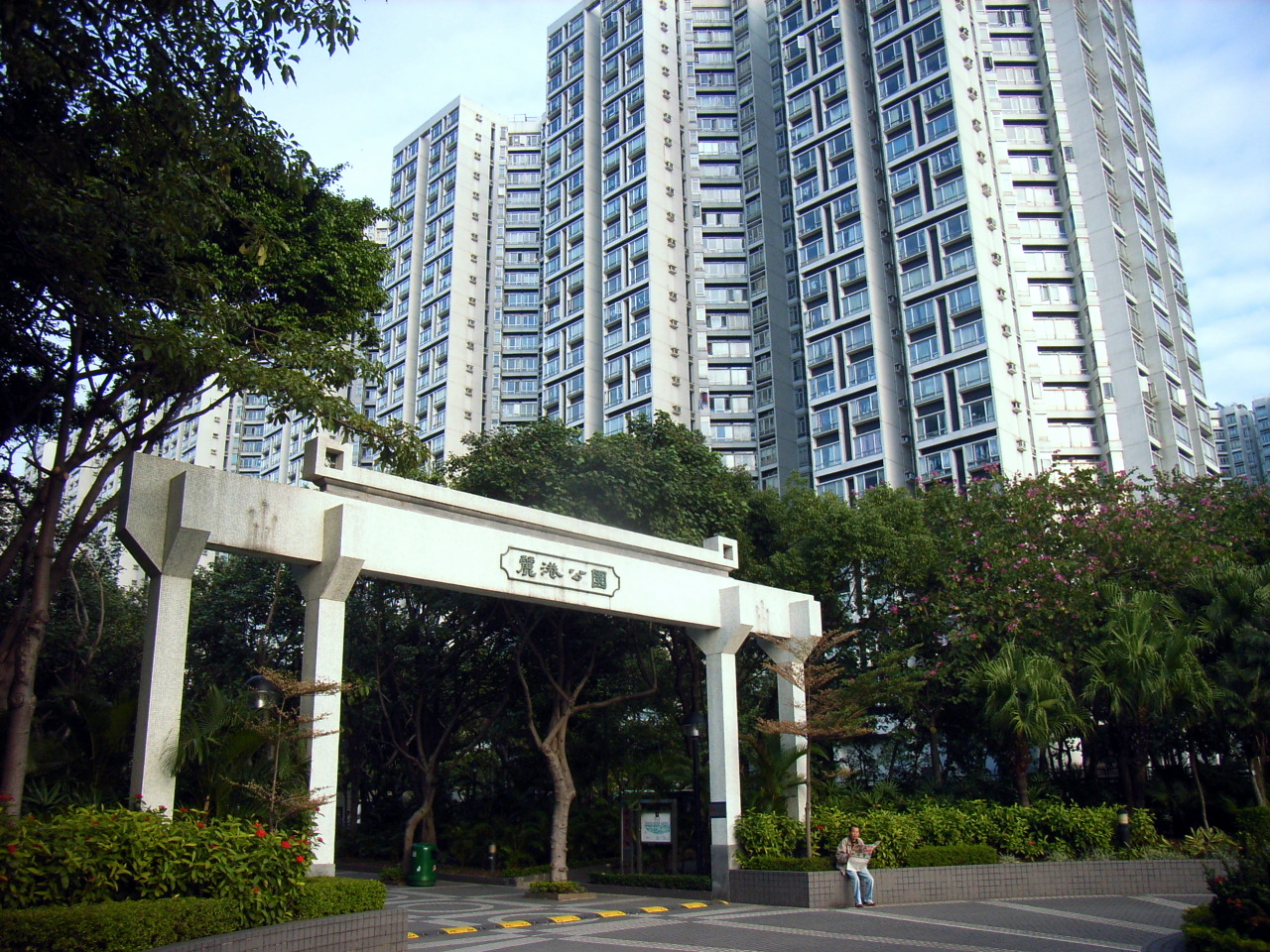
Laguna Park entrance

== Facilities ==
- 3 shopping centres, which are Laguna Plaza, Centre de Laguna and Laguna Arcade.
- 2 resident club house
- 1 park
- a few children playgrounds and jogging trails
- 1 pet park located near Laguna City in Cha Kwo Ling Promenade.
- 5 tennis court
- 2 basketball court
- 1 soccer pitch
- 1 public transport interchange with 3 bus routes and 2 minibus routes.
- 2 kindergartens
- Hong Kong Public Libraries mobile library Laguna City stop (Next to Laguna City Clubhouse 1)

== Education ==
Laguna City is in Primary One Admission (POA) School Net 48. Within the school net are multiple aided schools (operated independently but funded with government money) and Kwun Tong Government Primary School.

== Covid Pandemic ==
Blocks 5 and 7 of Laguna City were put under a coronavirus lockdown at 7pm on 31 January 2021, until 1 February.

== See also ==
- South Horizons, a private housing estate at Ap Lei Chau, was built from 1991 to 1995 by Hutchison Whampoa, partially on the former site of a Shell oil depot.
- Villa Esplanada, a private housing estate at Tsing Yi, located on the former site of the CRC Oil Storage Depot on the former island of Nga Ying Chau
- Sceneway Garden, a private housing estate next to Laguna City, both connected by the Lam Tin MTR station.
