= Hutchison Whampoa Property =

Property developer in Hong Kong

Hutchison Whampoa Property Limited 和記黃埔地產有限公司
- Company type: Privately owned company
- Industry: Properties
- Founded: 1971
- Successor: Hutchison Property Group Limited
- Headquarters: Central, Hong Kong
- Area served: Hong Kong
- Parent: Hutchison Whampoa
- Website: www.hwpg.com

Hutchison Whampoa Property Group was the property development and investment arm of Hutchison Whampoa of Hong Kong.

In 2015, the company was spun-out of Cheung Kong Holdings to form part of Cheung Kong Property Holdings. Hutchison Whampoa Properties Limited has since been renamed Hutchison Property Group Limited (和記地產集團有限公司).

== History ==
The company was formerly Hutchison Properties Limited (HPL). HPL was incorporated in 1971, as a wholly owned subsidiary of Hutchison International Limited (HIL). Shortly afterwards, it became a listed company and acquired the major property interests of HIL and its trading subsidiaries.

In 1980, HPL was privatized by Hutchison Whampoa Limited (HWL), making it once again a wholly owned subsidiary. In 1993, HWL formed Hutchison Whampoa Properties Limited to hold all the property interests of HWD, HPL and HWL's newly privatised subsidiary, CIHL.

== Properties ==
- Whampoa Garden
- Rambler Crest
- Cheung Kong Centre
- Provident Centre
- South Horizons
- Laguna City
- Caribbean Coast
