= Villa Esplanada =

Housing estate in Tsing Yi, Hong Kong

Coordinates: 22.3624°N 114.1031°E

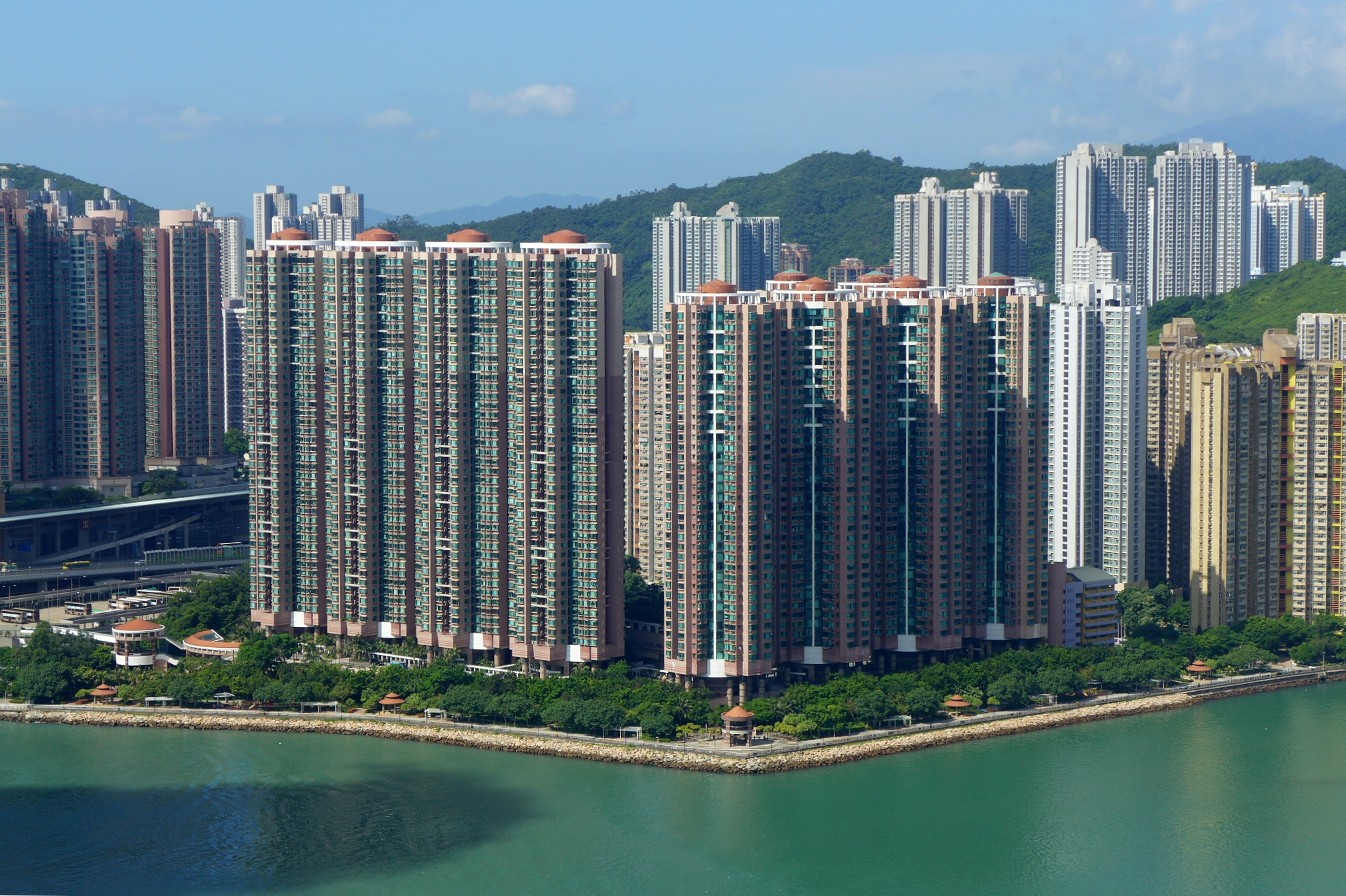
Villa Esplanada

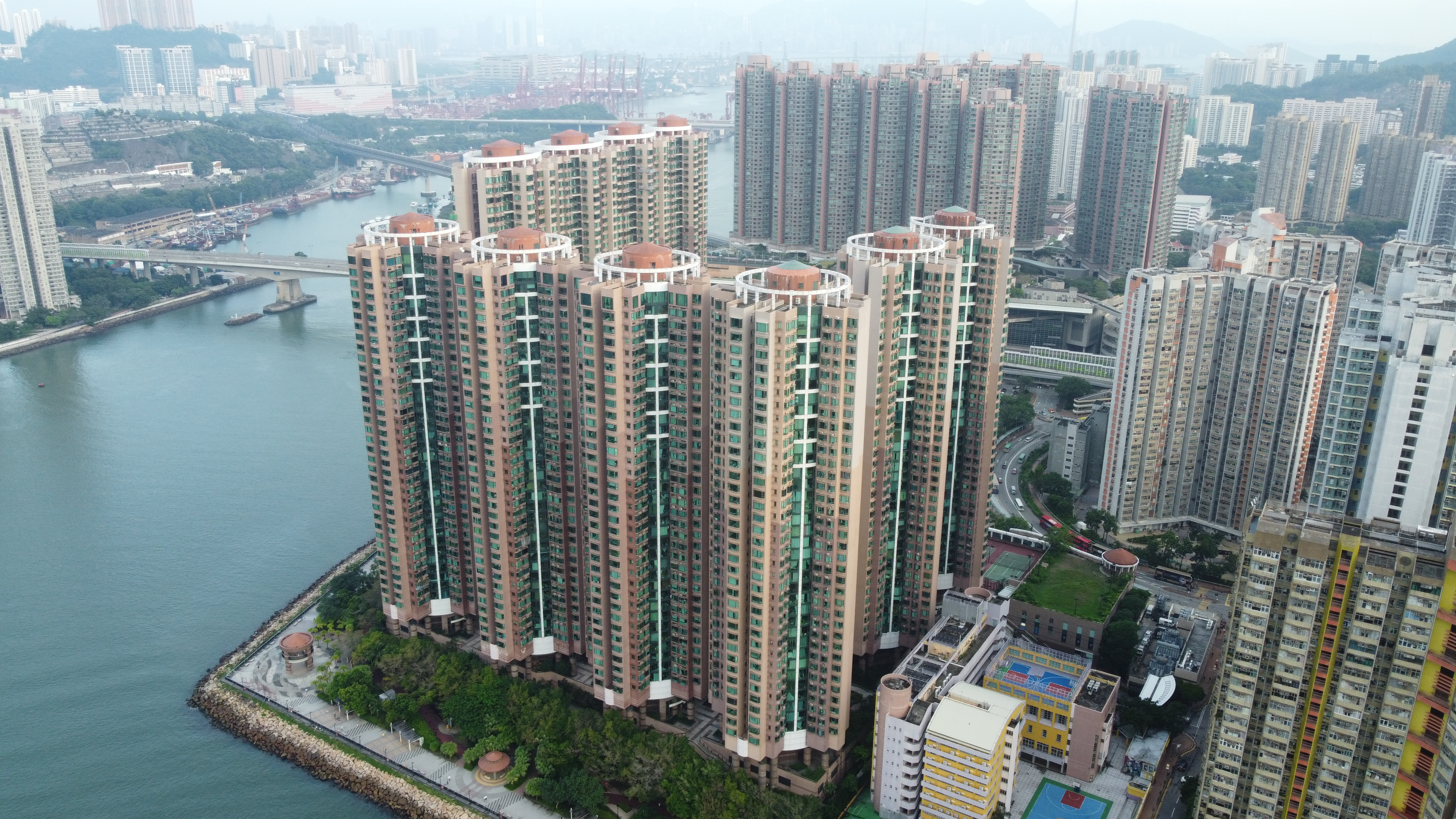
Villa Esplanada

Villa Esplanada (Chinese: 灝景灣) is a private housing estate developed by Sun Hung Kai Properties, China Resources and Cheung Kong Holdings on Tsing Yi Island in Hong Kong. It is located on the former site of the relocated oil depots on Nga Ying Chau, which was a separate island until it became part of Tsing Yi Island through land reclamation. The housing estate is close to Ching Wang Court, Tsing Yi station of MTR and Airport Express. The flats were sold in three phases.

The estate is a rough 7-minute walk to the nearby Tsing Yi station, and MTR mall Maritime Square.

It consists of ten blocks of high-rise buildings surrounded by a terrace of green plants and trees, adjacent to the seashore.

The estate contains a shopping mall which is managed by China Resources.

The estate contains a clubhouse that contains a small restaurant, an indoor swimming pool, an outdoor swimming pool, a gym, an indoor sports arena, a squash court, a table tennis room, a kids play area, as well as a garden and a barbecue area. Within the changing rooms, there are both saunas and steam rooms.

== See also ==
- CRC Oil Storage Depot
- Laguna City, a private housing estate at Lam Tin, partially built on the site of a former Shell oil depot
- South Horizons, a private housing estate at Ap Lei Chau, was built from 1991 to 1995 by Hutchison Whampoa, partially on the former site of a Shell oil depot.
