= CK Life Sciences =

CK Life Sciences International (Holdings) Inc.
- Native name: 長江生命科技集團有限公司
- Company type: Public
- Traded as: SEHK: 775
- Industry: Biotechnology
- Founded: 2000
- Headquarters: Hong Kong
- Area served: Hong Kong
- Key people: Victor Li Tzar-kuoi
- Products: Life Sciences products
- Services: Life Sciences
- Parent: Cheung Kong Holdings
- Website: www.ck-lifesciences.com

CK Life Sciences International (Holdings) Inc. (Chinese: 長江生命科技集團有限公司), or CK Life Sciences, is a subsidiary of CK Hutchison Holdings. It is engaged in research and development, commercialization, marketing and sale of biotechnology products. The chairman is Victor Li Tzar-kuoi, the eldest son of Li Ka-shing, the chairman of Cheung Kong Holdings.

It was established in 2000 and listed on the Hong Kong Stock Exchange via Growth Enterprise Market in 2002 (Former stock code: SEHK: 8222). It was transferred to Main Board of the Hong Kong Stock Exchange in 2008.

CK Life Sciences has operations in Australia, and in 2012 acquired an Australian salt company (Cheetham Salt) as part of its expansion into the agricultural sector.

The company divested its Canadian subsidiary WEX Pharmaceuticals to Virios Therapeutics for $100 million in October 2024.
