= Guangdong Technion – Israel Institute of Technology =

Technological institute in Shantou, Guangdong, China

- 广东以色列理工学院
- Type: Technical institute
- Established: December 16, 2015; 11 years ago
- Affiliations: Technion; Shantou University
- Chancellor: Gong Xingao
- Vice-Chancellor: Aaron Ciechanover
- Students: 1,729
- Location: Shantou
- Campus: Urban
- Language: English
- Website: gtiit.edu.cn gtiit.technion.ac.il

Chinese name
- Simplified Chinese: 广东以色列理工学院
- Traditional Chinese: 廣東以色列理工學院
Transcriptions
Standard Mandarin
- Hanyu Pinyin: Guǎngdōng Yǐsèliè Lǐgōng Xuéyuàn

The Guangdong Technion – Israel Institute of Technology (GTIIT) is a technological institute in Shantou, Guangdong, China. It was established in 2015 as a Sino-foreign cooperative university between Shantou University and Technion–Israel Institute of Technology. It is located on the southeast of the Shantou University campus.

== History ==
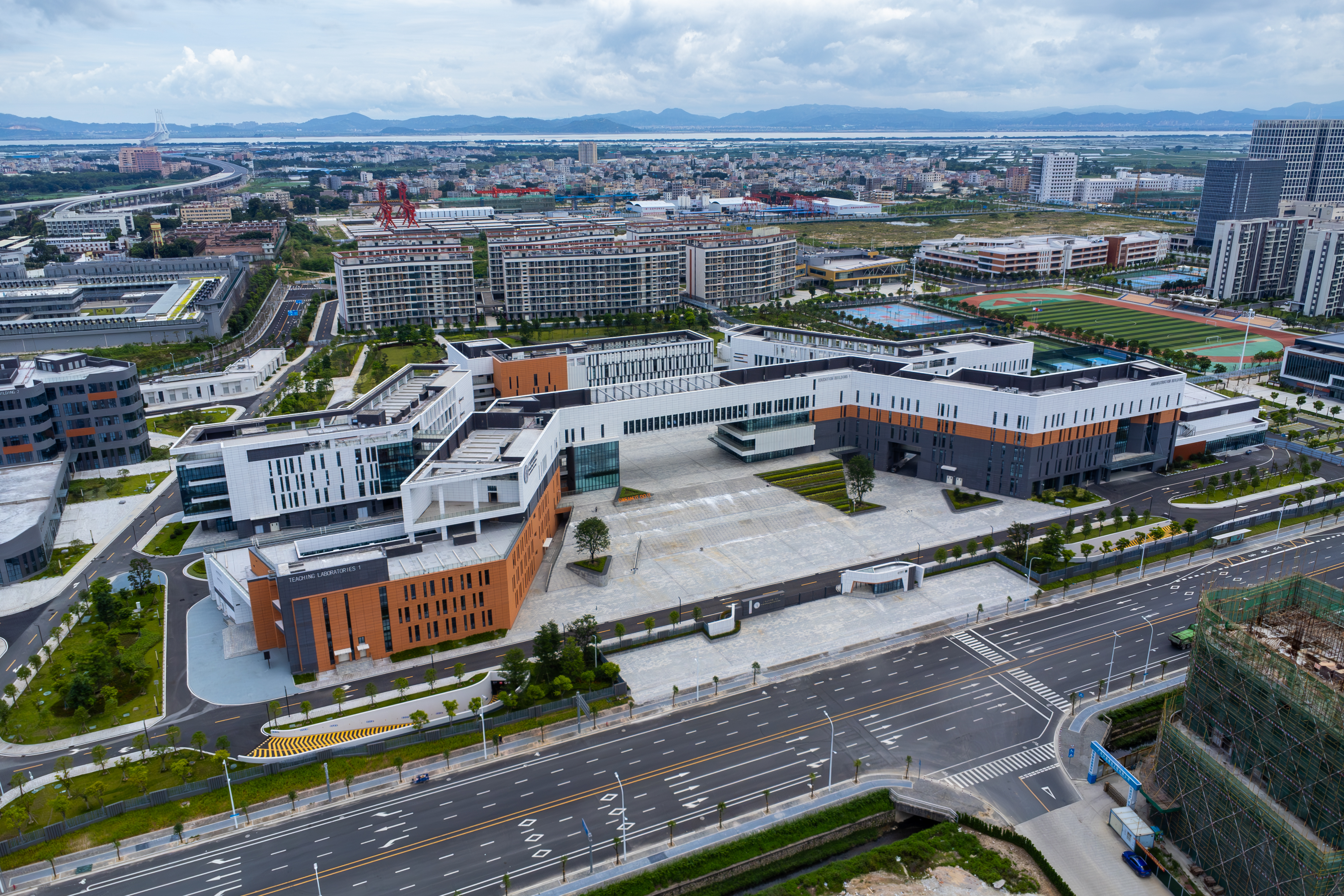
south campus of GTIIT

Guangdong Technion – Israel Institute of Technology is a joint cooperative higher education institution established by China and Israel. It is located at the east side and south side of Shantou University. On April 9, 2015, the establishment of the Guangdong Technion was approved by the Ministry of Education of China.

It was initially named "Technion Guangdong Institute of Technology". However, the institute was finally decided to be formally called the Guangdong Technion – Israel Institute of Technology.

Sponsored by the Li Ka Shing Foundation (LKSF) with a US$130 million grant, the establishment of the Guangdong Technion created the unprecedented cooperative relationship among Guangdong Government, Technion, and Shantou University. Also, Guangdong Province and Shantou Municipal Government will set aside CN¥ 900 million (approximately US$147 million) to fund construction and initial operations, and 330,000 square meters for the construction of the campus as well.

A cooperative agreement was signed on September 29, 2013, between the Technion and Shantou University, to confirm the establishment of the Guangdong Technion, which will be a not-for-profit research university. The new institute will eventually grant Technion engineering degrees at all levels – Bachelor, Masters and PhD, and maintain the same academic standards of education, research and innovation as Technion's Haifa campus.

Emblem of the Technion

== Education ==
=== Enrollment ===
The new institute will start the enrollment in 2016. It planned to enroll 100 students in Chemical engineering in the first year, and finally reaches a total number of students up to 5,000 people. The courses of the Guangdong Technion will be carried out in English. In the phase 1 of the institute (2015-2025), it will set up 3 colleges including Engineering, Science and Life science, with the number of students up to 2,365.

=== Campuses ===
The Guangdong Technion was planned to be constructed in two stages, respectively the north campus and the south one, which is also the main campus. The north campus will be constructed into a new group of buildings consisting of the teaching buildings, the administrative building, labs and dormitories. The north campus was finished in June 2016, and the whole campus will be done entirely in 2018.

The original administrative building of Shantou University was renovated as the transitional teaching building of the Guangdong Techion-Israel Institute of Technology when the formal teaching buildings of the Guangdong Technion are under construction. The cornerstone laying ceremony of the Guangdong Technion was held to formally celebrate construction of the Guangdong Technion campuses on December 16, 2015.

== Establishment ==
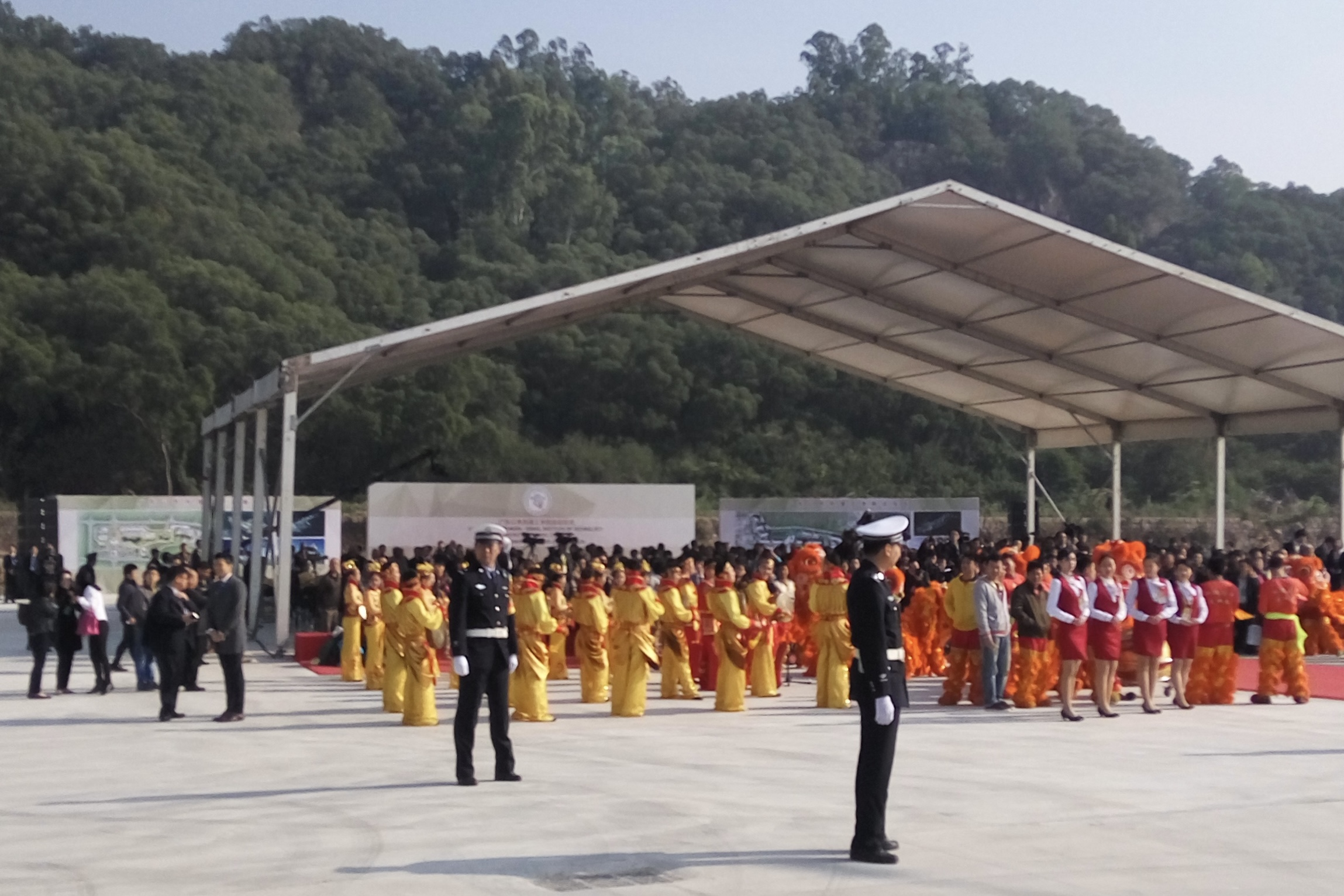
The University foundation launch of the Guangdong Technion

The foundation ceremony of the Guangdong Technion was held on December 16, 2015, in the new gymnasium of Shantou University. The groundbreaking ceremony was led by former Israeli President Shimon Peres, Hong Kong business leader and philanthropist Li Ka-shing, Technion President Peretz Lavie, the Guangdong Technion Chancellor Li Jian'ge, the Guangdong Technion Vice Chancellor, Technion Distinguished Professor and Nobel Laureate Aaron Ciechanover, and Ofir Akunis, Israel's Minister of Science, Technology and Space. About 5,000 students and teachers attended the ceremony.
