= Veritas College =

Veritas College 至诚书院
- Location in Guangdong, Shantou
- Coordinates: 23°21′55″N 116°42′07″E
- Country: People's Republic of China
- Province: Guangdong
- Prefecture-level city: Shantou
- Website: https://veritas.stu.edu.cn/

Chinese name
- Simplified Chinese: 至诚书院
- Traditional Chinese: 至誠書院
Transcriptions
Standard Mandarin
- Hanyu Pinyin: Zhìchéng Shūyuàn

Veritas College is a residential college of Shantou University. It was established in July 2008, the first residential college in mainland China. Veritas College's purpose was to organize various academic and community activities with the expectation of enriching the educational experience and extra-curricular life of the residential students. This change from a traditional dormitory format was intended to encourage residential students from different majors to socially network, share knowledge and ideas, develop interpersonal relationships, and strengthen their confidence, independence and sense of social responsibility.

== Motto ==
The motto of Veritas College is 诚，敬，谦，和. In English, this roughly translates as "Sincerity, Respect, Modesty, Harmony."

== Location ==
The college is located in Jinping District, Shantou, Guangdong Province, near the east gate of Shantou University.

== Courses, camps and activities ==
Veritas College provides not only living accommodations, but also a place for learning and sharing. At Veritas College, residential students come from a range different colleges and majors. Veritas College has its own student union and clubs, which serve as a platform for students to make friends, share experiences, and learn from each other. The college also provides students additional extracurricular courses and camps.

== Student union and other organizations ==
=== Student union ===
Founded in 2008, the student union hosts various activities to serve students. The most popular activities are the welcoming and farewell parties. The president and council of the student union are selected by all student residents.

=== Ivy League ===
Founded in 2009, the Ivy League club is a volunteer organization. It has a council with a president and two vice presidents. The leadership council helps run the whole organization, including 7 departments and a volunteer group. The most popular activities involve assisting high school students, working with young children, a summer camp, and the TEDx Talk at STU.

=== Youth League branch ===
The Youth League branch of Veritas College is associated with the China Communist Youth League. The Youth League aims to educate the youth on, and promote, the values of the Communist Party.

=== Monitors ===
Founded in 2008, the monitors are special representatives of Veritas College. The monitors usually are junior students. They serve as role models in academic, moral, and other personal aspects. They are selected to guide the freshmen in adapting to college life, and also serve as mentors. Monitors themselves are trained and supervised.

=== Party branch ===
The Party branch of Veritas College refers to the campus branch of the Chinese Communist Party. Usually its activities are closed to its own members.

=== Veritas College Magazine ===
Founded in 2008, the Veritas College Magazine features articles about college life. It is published at the beginning of the semesters, and is produced by a group of journalists and editors.

=== Clubs and societies ===
==== The Polar Star Outdoor Expedition Club ====
Founded in 2013, the Polar Star Outdoor Expedition Club is a club for students who enjoy outdoor activities, such as climbing mountains, camping, etc. Every two years, the club holds a Chief ATP Camp to train members in teamwork and survival skills.

==== Lingxi Psychology Club ====
Founded in 2010, the club aims to provide professional psychology information and cultivate students' interest in mental health. The club is directed by instructor Dong-ping Jiang, who has a master in psychology.

==== Debate Team ====
Founded in 2008, Veritas College's debate team participates in regional and national tournaments.

==== Traditional Studies Club ====
Founded in 2009, the Traditional Studies Club was founded to enable students to participate in traditional culture studies. Members study Confucianism, Taoism, Laozi, traditional Chinese poems, etc.

==== Deyi Gu Qin Club ====
Founded in 2010, the Deyi Gu Qin Club is a club devoted to studying a traditional Chinese instrument, the Gu Qin. The club also holds the Gu Qin Culture Study Camp every year.

== History ==
The concept of residential colleges originated in Cambridge University, UK, but Hong Kong University (HKU) pioneered the first example in greater China. Professor Li Dan brought this concept to Shantou University after visiting HKU, which led to the establishment of the first residential college in mainland China. Other universities in mainland China have been motivated by Veritas College's example, and are starting their own residential colleges.

After only one year of operation, the student response to Veritas College at Shantou University was overwhelmingly positive. Because of ongoing student and faculty feedback, Shantou University has committed to establishing more residential colleges on the campus.
