= Shantou University Medical College =

Medical school of Shantou University, China

Shantou University Medical College (SUMC; simplified Chinese: 汕头大学医学院; traditional Chinese: 汕頭大學醫學院), shortly "Shantou Medical College" or "Swatow School of Medicine", is the medical school of Shantou University in eastern Guangdong Province of China. With a history traced back to 1924, the college is now a public medical school with over ten affiliated and teaching hospitals, integrating medical teaching, research and treatment.

== History ==
In 1924, the Chaozhou Obstetrics Training Institute was established. It subsequently underwent several developments and name changes: Shantou Obstetrics School, Shantou Municipal Senior Midwifery Vocational School, Shantou Municipal Senior Midwifery Technical School, Shantou Municipal Health Technical School, Guangdong Provincial Seventh Health School, Shantou Health School, Shantou Junior Medical College, etc.

In 1977, the program Bachelor of Medicine started instruction.

In September 1983, with the approval of the State Council of China, the school became the Medical College of Shantou University.

In 1984, the Journal of Shantou University Medical College (汕头大学医学院学报 ) was founded.

In 1989, the First Affiliated Hospital of Shantou University Medical College was founded.

In 2010, program Bachelor of Medicine, Bachelor of Surgery (M.B.B.S.) start running.

In 2015, program Master of Medicine started running.

In 2023, the Affiliated Cancer Hospital became the first Grade III Class A oncology hospital in eastern Guangdong.

In 2026, the first public dental hospital in eastern Guangdong was established by Shantou University Medical College.

== Programs ==
Shantou University Medical College offers programs for undergraduate, master and doctoral degrees, including

- Bachelor of Medicine (5 years).
- Bachelor of Medicine, Bachelor of Surgery (M.B.B.S., 5 years).
- Master of Medicine (8 years).

As of March, 2026, there are 5,578 full-time students enrolled in the medical college, including 3,643 undergraduates, 1,711 master's students, 176 doctoral students, and 48 international students.

== Hospitals ==
The hospitals of Shantou University Medical College includes

- 5 directly affiliated hospitals (First Affiliated Hospital, Second Affiliated Hospital, Mental Health Center, Affiliated Cancer Hospital, and Shantou International Eye Center),
- 1 dental hospital,
- and 10 clinical colleges (Shenzhen Pediatric Clinical College, Luohu Clinical College, Yuebei Clinical College, Longgang Maternal and Child Health Clinical College, Peking University Shenzhen Clinical College, Meizhou Clinical College, Longgang Clinical College, Longgang Third People's Hospital Clinical College, Bao'an Clinical College, and Xiaolan Clinical College).

among which, the First Affiliated Hospital of Shantou University Medical College is a large comprehensive 3A hospital with 1,816 beds. In 2017, the hospital set up the first international medical department in east Guangdong province. It has the largest resort home in the country.

== Other information ==
Shantou University Medical College currently has 526 full-time faculty members, including 6 professors who were selected for the 2025 list of the world's top 2% of scientists. It is among the first batch of pilot schools for the National Excellent Physician Education and Training Program and in the Guangdong Province's High-Level Key Discipline Construction Project.

In academic research, the college published 51 papers listed in Nature Index for the Time frame of 1 April 2025 - 31 March 2026, including 36 in Health sciences. The college's Clinical Medicine has been among the top 1% of ESI globally for 13 consecutive years since 2012.

The college has international cooperation and exchange with 77 higher education and research institutions in 17 countries and regions, including Canada, the Netherlands, Italy, Australia and Hong Kong.

The college hosts the Journal of Shantou University Medical College (汕头大学医学院学报 ), with sections covering basic medicine, clinical medicine, surveys and research, technical methods, case reports, and reviews.

Under the personal advocacy and care of Mr. Li Ka-shing, the college established the first college student palliative care volunteer team in the country and won the gold medal in the "First China Youth Volunteer Service Project Competition".

Medical degrees obtained from Shantou University Medical College are acceptable to the provincial/territorial medical regulatory authorities in Canada, and graduates of this college are eligible to apply for ECFMG Certification in the United States of America. However, as of August 2026, the United Kingdom's General Medical Council (GMC) lists Shantou University Medical College on its official register of "Overseas medical qualifications we do not accept."

Contact Address: 22 Xinling Road, Shantou, 515031, Guangdong Province, China.

== See also ==
- Shantou University
- List of medical schools in China
