= Li Ka-shing =

Hong Kong entrepreneur (born 1928)

The Honourable Sir Ka-shing Li GBM KBE JP
- 李嘉誠
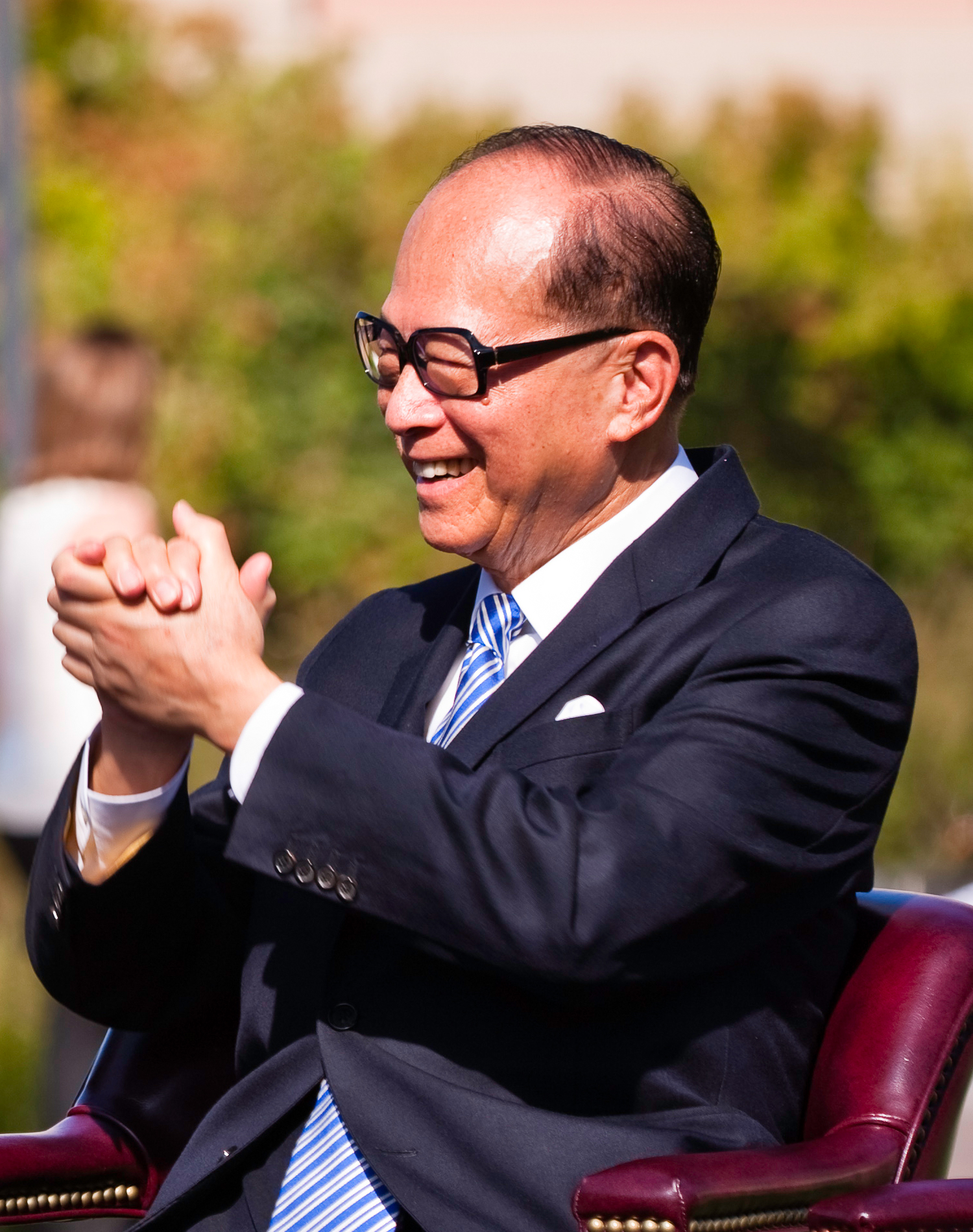
- Li in 2010
- Born: 29 July 1928 (age 98); Chaozhou, Guangdong, Republic of China
- Citizenship: China (Hong Kong); Canada
- Occupation: Chairman of Li Ka Shing Foundation
- Spouse: Chong Yuet-ming (m. 1962; died 1990)
- Children: Victor Li Tzar-kuoi (son); Richard Li Tzar-kai (son)

Chinese name
- Traditional Chinese: 李嘉誠
- Simplified Chinese: 李嘉诚
Transcriptions
Standard Mandarin
- Hanyu Pinyin: Lǐ Jiāchéng
Wu
- Romanization: Li-ga-sen
Hakka
- Romanization: Li^{31}Ga^{44}Sing^{11}
Yue: Cantonese
- Jyutping: Lei^{5} Gaa^{1}-sing^{4}
Southern Min
- Hokkien POJ: Lí Ka-sêng
- Teochew Peng'im: Li^{2} Gia^{1}-sêng^{5}

Sir Ka-shing Li (Chinese: 李嘉誠; born 29 July 1928) is a Hong Kong tycoon and philanthropist. He previously served as chairman of CK Hutchison Holdings and CK Asset Holdings, before retiring from those roles in May 2018. Following his retirement, he assumed the position of senior advisor to both companies. He is an investor, developer, and operator of the largest health and beauty retailer in Asia and Europe. In the 2026 Forbes list of The World's Billionaires, Li Ka-shing was ranked 42nd with a net worth of $47 billion.

Li has invested in a range of industries, including transportation, real estate, financial services, retail, and energy and utilities. His conglomerate, Cheung Kong Holdings has operated businesses across multiple sectors of the Hong Kong economy and has at times accounted for a notable share of the total market capitalisation of the Hong Kong Stock Exchange. Forbes magazine and the Forbes family honoured Li Ka-shing with the first ever Malcolm S. Forbes Lifetime Achievement Award on 5 September 2006 in Singapore. In spite of his wealth, Li has cultivated a reputation for leading a frugal no-frills lifestyle, and is known to wear simple black dress shoes and an inexpensive Seiko wristwatch. He lived in the same house for decades, in what has now become one of the most expensive districts in Hong Kong, Deep Water Bay in Hong Kong Island. Li is also a philanthropist, donating billions of dollars to charity and various other philanthropic causes, and owning the second largest private foundation in the world after Bill & Melinda Gates Foundation. In 2019, Forbes put Li in the list of most generous philanthropists outside of the US.

== Early life ==
Li was born in Chao'an, Chaozhou, in Guangdong Province in 1928 to Teochew parents named Li Yun-ching (1898–1943) and Cheung Bik-chin (1893–1984). Li and his family fled to Hong Kong in 1940 as refugees from the Sino-Japanese war. Following his father's death from tuberculosis, Li left school at 15 years old to work in a plastics trading company for 16 hours a day. In 1950, he started his own company, Cheung Kong Industries. From manufacturing plastics, Li developed his company into a leading real estate investment company in Hong Kong that was listed on the Hong Kong Stock Exchange in 1972. Cheung Kong expanded by acquiring Hutchison Whampoa and Hongkong Electric Holdings in 1979 and 1985 respectively.

== Business career ==
=== Plastics manufacturing ===
In 1950, after learning how to operate a plant, Li founded a plastic manufacturing company in Hong Kong with personal savings and funds borrowed from relatives. Li read trade publications and business news before entering the artificial flowers industry. Li learned the technique of mixing colour with plastics that resemble real flowers. After retooling his shop, Li received a large order from a foreign buyer and subsequently grew to be the largest supplier of plastic flowers in Asia.

=== Real estate ===
In 1958, Li purchased a site to develop his own factory building. An opportunity to acquire more land arrived after the 1967 riots when many people fled Hong Kong, and, as a result, property prices plummeted. Li believed the political crisis would be temporary and property prices would eventually rise, and bought land from the fleeing residents at low prices. In 1971, Li officially named his real estate development company Cheung Kong (長江實業). Cheung Kong Holdings was publicly listed in Hong Kong Stock Exchange in 1972. During board meetings, Li stated on a number of occasions his goal of surpassing the Jardines-owned Hongkong Land as a leading developer.

The successful bid by Cheung Kong for development sites above the Central and Admiralty MTR stations in 1977 was the key to challenging Hongkong Land as the premier property developer in Hong Kong. Despite its size, Jardines decided in the 1980s to protect itself from hostile takeover by Li or other outside investors. The company implemented a cross-shareholding structure that was designed to place control in the hands of Britain's Keswick family despite their less than 10% holdings in the group. In 1984, the company also moved its legal domicile from Hong Kong to another British overseas territory – Bermuda, in anticipation of the transfer of sovereignty of Hong Kong to People's Republic of China in 1997.

In an effort to drive forward divestitures of assets in Hong Kong and mainland China, Li agreed to sell The Center, the fifth-tallest skyscraper in Hong Kong. With a value of HK$40.2 billion (US$5.15 billion), the deal constitutes the biggest ever office space real estate sale in the Asia-Pacific region. Li sold the Century Link complex in Shanghai for US$2.95 billion, the second largest transaction for a single building, according to the Financial Times.

In 1979, Li purchased a major stake in Hutchison Whampoa from Hong Kong Bank through Cheung Kong.

=== Retail ===
A subsidiary of CK Hutchison, AS Watson (ASW), is a retail operator with over 15,000 stores. Its portfolio encompasses retail brands in Europe such as Superdrug (UK), Marionnaud (France), Kruidvat (Benelux countries), and in Asia including health and beauty retailer Watson's store and wine cellars et al., PARKnSHOP supermarkets (and spin-off brands), and Fortress electrical appliance stores. ASW also produces and distributes water products and beverages in the region.

=== Asset trading ===
CK Hutchison builds up new businesses and sells them off when shareholder value can be created. Profits were obtained in the sale of its interest in Orange to Mannesmann Group in 1999, making a profit of US$15.12 billion. In 2006, Li sold 20% of Hutchison's ports business to Singapore rival PSA Corporation, making a US$3.12 billion profit on a US$4 billion deal.

Group subsidiary Hutchison Telecommunications sold a controlling stake of 67% in Hutchison Essar, a joint venture Mobile operator in India, to Vodafone for US$11.1 billion.

=== Internet and technology ===
Li has also made a foray into the technology business, where his investment and venture capital firm Horizons Ventures is specifically allocated towards backing new internet and technology startup firms, and bought a stake in doubleTwist. His other firm, the Li Ka Shing Foundation bought a 0.8% stake in social networking website Facebook for US$120 million in two separate rounds, and invested an estimated US$50 million in the music streaming service Spotify. Some time between late 2009 and early 2010, Li Ka-shing led a US$15.5 million Series B round of financing for Siri Inc.

In 2011, Horizons Ventures invested in Summly, a website-summarizing app. Notably, the investment made Nick D'Aloisio, Summly's founder, the world's youngest person to receive a venture capital investment at just fifteen years old. In 2012, Horizons Ventures invested US$2.3 million in Wibbitz, a company that provides a text-to-video technology that can automatically convert any article post or feed on the web into a video in a matter of seconds. In August 2012, Li acquired a stake in Ginger Software Incorporated. In 2013, Horizons Ventures invested in bitcoin payment company BitPay.

In February 2015, Horizons Ventures participated in a US$30 million Series C funding round in Zoom Video Communications. Later in the year, Li participated in a US$108 million Series D round in Impossible Foods. In 2016, he continued investments in technology companies and Horizons Ventures led a US$55 million Series A round in Blockstream, the leader in blockchain related technologies, and also invested in a startup incubator fund Expa, that works with the founders to build new companies.

In September 2017, Li worked with Alibaba's Jack Ma to bring AlipayHK, a digital wallet service, to Hong Kong.

=== Water ===
Through CK Infrastructure Holdings Limited, Li owns 75% of British water supplier Northumbrian Water, the remaining 25% being held by US private equity firm KKR. Despite losses of ~£22 million between March 2022 and July 2023, CK Group and KKR between them took £159 million in dividends from the organisation which in the same period paid its chief executive, Heidi Mottram, $1.24 million. In 2022 the business was fined £240,000 for discharging untreated sewage into a water course in northeast England over a period of two days.

=== Australian tax dispute ===
In 2013, a claim was lodged by the Australian Taxation Office (ATO) against Cheung Kong Infrastructure (CKI) to pay approximately A$370 million in unpaid tax, penalties and interest relating to tax disputes concerning SA Power Networks and Victoria Power Networks. The dispute was resolved in 2015 when CKI entered into an agreement with the ATO. No penalty was levied against CKI and a sum of approximately A$24 million was refunded from the A$64 million previously paid to the ATO by CKI.

=== Retirement ===
After his almost-70-year reign over CK Hutchison Holdings and CK Asset Holdings, Li announced his retirement on 16 March 2018 and the decision to pass control of his US$100 billion empire to his son, Victor Li. He is still involved in the conglomerate as a senior advisor.

=== Others ===
Besides business through his flagship companies CK Asset Holdings and CK Hutchison Holdings, Li Ka-shing has also personally invested extensively in real estate in Singapore and Canada. He was the single largest shareholder of Canadian Imperial Bank of Commerce (CIBC), the fifth largest bank in Canada, until the sale of his share in 2005 (with all proceedings donated, see below). He is also the majority shareholder of a major energy company, Husky Energy, based in Alberta, Canada. Husky was acquired by Cenovus in 2021, and Li owns 27.2% of the newly merged company.

In January 2005, Li announced plans to sell his CA$1.2 billion stake in the Canadian Imperial Bank of Commerce, with all proceeds going to private charitable foundations established by Li, including the Li Ka Shing Foundation in Hong Kong and the Li Ka Shing (Canada) Foundation based in Toronto, Ontario. Li was the non-executive director of the Hongkong & Shanghai Banking Corporation since 1980 and became deputy chairman of the bank in 1985. He was also Deputy Chairman of HSBC in 1991–1992.

According to Bloomberg, he had a net worth of US$35.3 billion in July 2021.

== Personal life ==
Li was married to his first cousin, Chong Yuet-ming (1933–1990) in 1962 until her sudden death on New Year's Day 1990 due to a suspected drug overdose (other sources name the cause as cardiac arrest). She was the daughter of his maternal uncle (mother's younger brother), Cheung Jing-on (1908–1996) and his wife, Hew Bik-yin (1911–2002), who were also from the Chaoshan region. Both settled in British Hong Kong long before Li migrated to the city. He has two sons, Victor and Richard, both Canadian citizens. Victor Li succeeded his father as Chairman of CK Hutchison Holdings and Chairman of CK Asset Holdings, while Richard Li is Chairman of PCCW, the largest telecom company in Hong Kong. He is a follower of Buddhism.

Li has been called "plainly dressed" for a Hong Kong tycoon. In the 1990s, he wore a HK$50 timepiece from Citizen Watch and plain ties. He later wore a Seiko. In 2016, he wore a HK$500 Citizen watch. Most recently he has been spotted wearing an Apple Watch.

His son Victor Li was kidnapped in 1996 on his way home after work by gangster Cheung Tze-keung (aka "Big Spender"). Li Ka-shing paid a ransom of HK$1 billion directly to Cheung, who had come to his house. A report was never filed with Hong Kong police. Instead the case was pursued by mainland authorities, leading to Cheung's execution in 1998, an outcome not possible under Hong Kong law. Rumours circulated of a deal between Li and the mainland.

== Awards and honours ==
- Grand Bauhinia Medal
- Knight Commander of the Order of the British Empire
- Commandeur, Légion d'honneur
- Honorary Doctor of Laws, University of Hong Kong

== Politics ==
For many years, he was considered to be a pro-Beijing figure. However, in 2010s, tensions had been growing between Li and the mainland. During the 2019–20 Hong Kong protests, he refused to outright condemn the protesters, instead urging for peace and calling on the authorities to respond to the protesters humanely.

On 4 August 2011 at the interim results announcement for Hutchison Whampoa, Li endorsed Henry Tang for the forthcoming chief executive election. Then Li said "You all can be just like me, one-person-one-vote (一人一票)." The media then looked at Li in disbelief, and pointed out that regular citizens do not get one-person-one-vote. Li then tried to laugh it off and said "maybe in 2017 they will have one-person-one-vote to choose the chief executive, I probably just said it a little early." However, Li was criticised by Chinese official state-run press agency Xinhua for being ambiguous in his opposition to the Umbrella movement protests and his support for Leung. Later, prior to the Legco vote, Li said that the largest threat to Hong Kong's future was if the government failed to ensure passage of the 2014–15 round of political reform.

Li's business empire has a presence around the world, including China. Li came under attack from the Global Times newspaper in early 2015, when his companies put out word that it was considering selling prime Shanghai and Beijing properties. It became apparent that Li aimed at re-weighting his asset portfolio to more stable and transparent markets in the West. Concerted attacks ensued and went into a crescendo as China's economy slowed down dramatically in the second half of the year, and the central government sought a way to stem the capital outflows. Specific reproaches were that his asset disposals were "an act of ingratitude" and "immoral at such a sensitive juncture". Security Times, a People's Daily publication, estimated that Li has sold at least CN¥73.8 billion worth of assets since 2014. Li's holding companies denied divesting in China, saying that its asset disposals were being undertaken in the ordinary course of business. The attacks stopped abruptly several weeks later, when editorials in official publications such as People's Daily and Beijing Youth Daily took a neutral stance in unison.

== Philanthropic efforts and Li Ka Shing Foundation ==
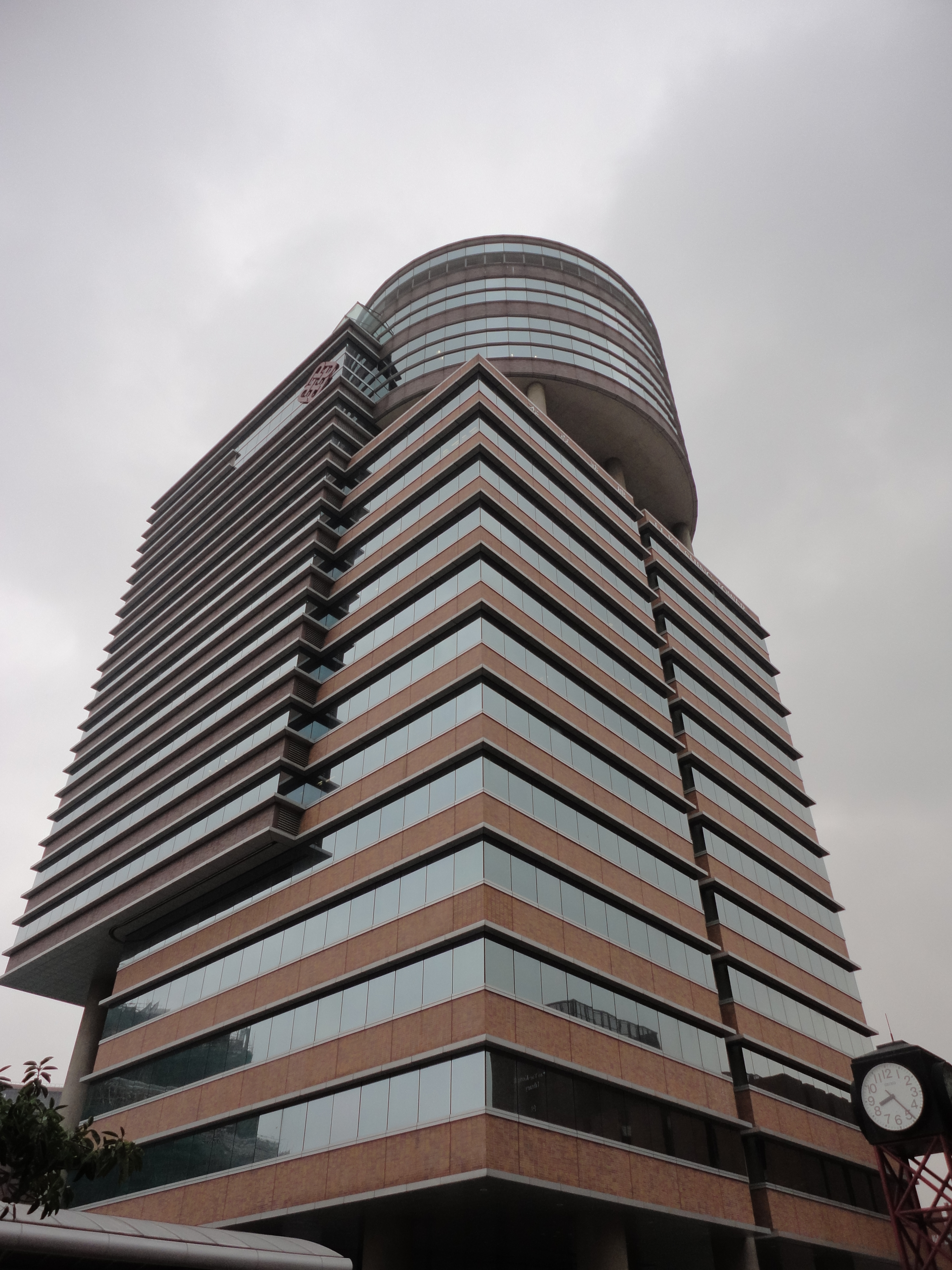
Li Ka Shing Tower of the Hong Kong Polytechnic University

Li Ka-shing established the Li Ka Shing Foundation in 1980, with its activities focusing primarily on education, healthcare, medical research, and poverty relief. The foundation has funded projects in Hong Kong, mainland China, and other countries. According to the foundation, Li committed more than HK$30 billion to charitable and related projects, with approximately 80% of its activities in mainland China and Hong Kong.

In 1981, Li's donations contributed to the establishment of Shantou University (STU) and the Shantou University Medical College, near his hometown of Chaozhou. The donation subsequently provided funding for the university. In 2013, he contributed $130 million toward the establishment of the Guangdong Technion – Israel Institute of Technology, a joint venture between Technion – Israel Institute of Technology and Shantou University. Li has also donated to universities and educational institutions in Hong Kong, Singapore, the United Kingdom, Canada, and the United States. Among the institutions to receive financial support are the Hong Kong Polytechnic University, University of Cambridge, University of California, Berkeley, Stanford University, National University of Singapore, University of Alberta, and McGill University, some of which named campus areas after Li.

In November 2002, the Cheung Kong Graduate School of Business in China was founded with a large donation from the Li Ka Shing Foundation. The same year, the Li Ka Shing Library at the Singapore Management University was amed in his honour after a US$11.5 million donation in to the higher education institution.

The foundation has provided financial assistance following major natural disasters, including the 2004 Indian Ocean earthquake and tsunami, the 2008 Sichuan earthquake, and the April 2015 Nepal earthquake. It has also supported international humanitarian organisations and disaster-relief programmes.

In Hong Kong, Li and the foundation have supported medical treatment and social-welfare programs, including assistance for patients who are not eligible for government assistance. During the COVID-19 pandemic, Li donated funding through the foundation for medical services, protective equipment, and social-welfare organizations. The foundation has also supported community and cultural initiatives, including the development of Tsz Shan Monastery, which opened in 2015.

In the 2020s, the foundation continued to donate to medical research, healthcare and social programs. In 2024, it contributed $4 million to hepatology and cancer research at the University of Michigan, and donated histotripsy systems to the University of Hong Kong and Chinese University of Hong Kong.

== See also ==
- Hong (business)
- Li's field
- List of Hong Kong people by net worth
