= CRC Oil Storage Depot =

Former oil terminal in Hong Kong

CRC Oil Storage Depot was an oil terminal in Hong Kong owned by China Resources Petroleum Company Limited (CRC). The oil storage depot was located on Nga Ying Chau, a former island off Tsing Yi.

Esso Standard Oil (HK) Limited owned the depot. Esso gave Gammon a £222,000 contract to do excavation for its oil storage facility. The project consisted of reclaiming a seven-acre site. Around February 1965, Gammon started the reclamation project. Esso also gave Gammon (Hongkong) Ltd a £172,000 contract to build the docking infrastructure to support the oil terminal. By October 1965, two-thirds of the work had been done.

The depot was 39,000 m^{2} (0.015 sq mi) in 1987 and had the ability to hold 21,000 m^{3} (740,000 ft^{3}) of oil and associated materials. The site had 23 oil tankers in 1990.

The site is now occupied by the Villa Esplanada private housing estate, by jointing venture with Sun Hung Kai Properties and Cheung Kong Holdings.

== See also ==
- Energy in Hong Kong
