= China Resources Petroleum Company =

Chinese petrol product company (1991–2007)

China Resources Petroleum Company Limited (Chinese: 華潤石化), was a subsidiary of China Resources (CRC), and was a major petroleum product company in China from 1991–2007. CRC was created in 1991 and had operations throughout Southeast Asia and based in Hong Kong. CR Enterprises disposed Dongguan China Resources Petrochems to Sinopec at the end of 2005, the mainland petrochemical services in October 2006 and the business in Hong Kong to Sinopec in 2007.

CRC consisted of:

- CRC Petroleum
- CRC Chemical
- CRC LPG
- CRC Callony
- CRC PFS
- Oleochemicals

== See also ==
- Energy in Hong Kong
- CRC Oil Storage Depot
