= Cheung Kong Graduate School of Business =

Private graduate school of business in Beijing, China

- 长江商学院
- Type: Privately graduate school of business
- Established: November 2002; 24 years ago
- Affiliations: Li Ka Shing Foundation
- Dean: Xiang Bing
- Location: Beijing, China
- Campus: Urban
- Website: ckgsb.com ckgsb.edu.cn

Chinese name
- Simplified Chinese: 长江商学院
- Traditional Chinese: 長江商學院
Transcriptions
Standard Mandarin
- Hanyu Pinyin: Chángjiāng Shāngxuéyuàn

Main campus in Beijing

The Cheung Kong Graduate School of Business (CKGSB) is a privately owned graduate school of business located in Beijing, China.

CKGSB maintains training centers in Shanghai and Shenzhen, as well as offices in Hong Kong, New York City and London.

== History ==
The school was established in November 2002 through the financial support of the Li Ka Shing Foundation. The school offers MBA, Finance MBA, Executive MBA, Business Scholars Program, and short-term Executive Education programs to both Chinese and international students.

== School name and logo ==
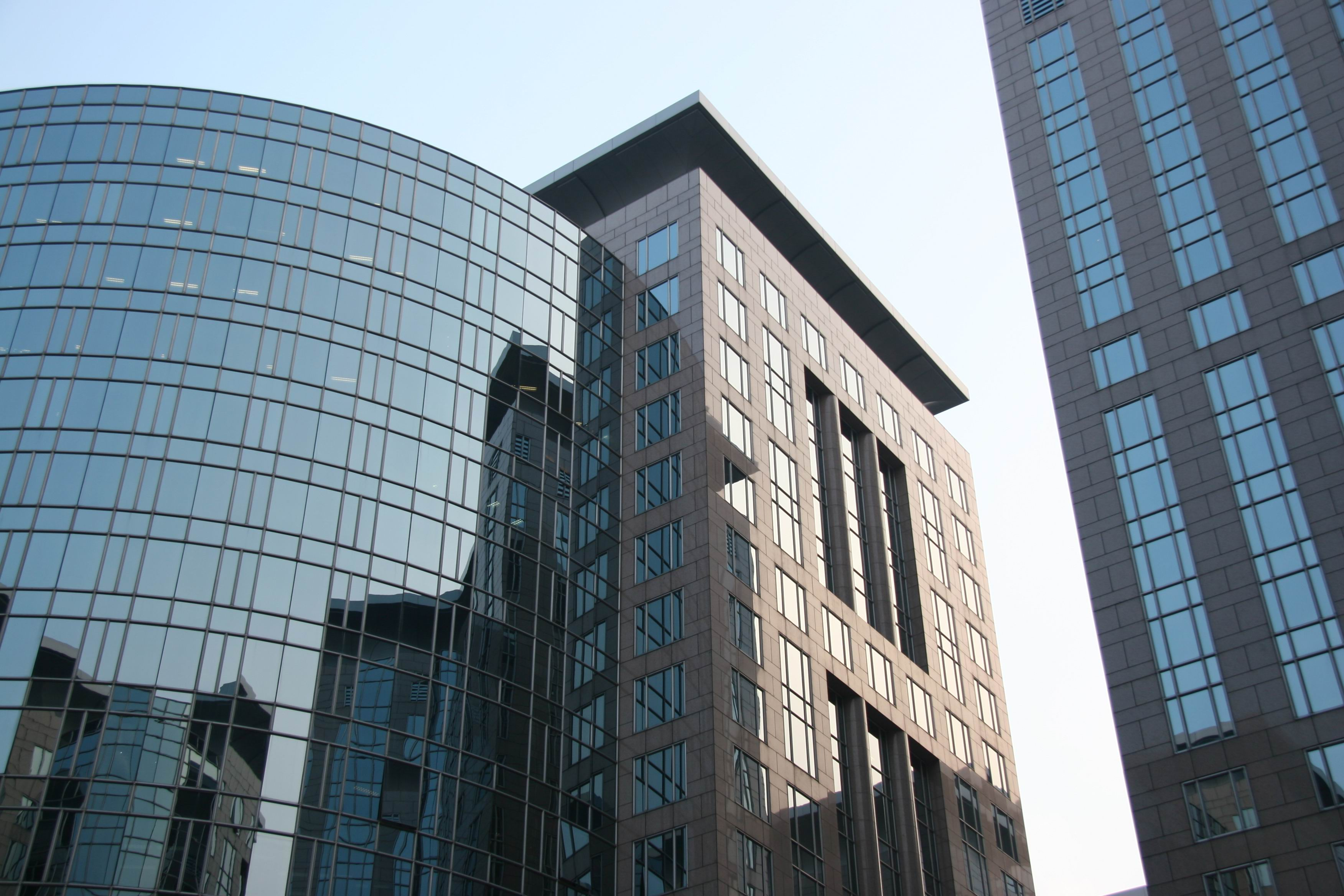
Cheung Kong GSB Beijing Campus

The "Cheung Kong" from CKGSB's name comes directly from the name of Li Ka Shing's Cheung Kong (Holdings). "Cheung Kong" in Cantonese (and "Chang Jiang" in Mandarin) is the name for China's longest river, the Yangtze River. The three vertical lines in the logo represent the ancient Chinese writing style, while the three horizontal ones indicate Western style writing, overall symbolizing the integration of Eastern and Western values and knowledge in the school. The lower right corner represents the Mandarin initials of the Yangtze River, "Chang Jiang".
