= Li Ka Shing Foundation =

Hong Kong-based charitable organization

- 李嘉诚基金会 (Chinese)
- Abbreviation: LKSF
- Founded: 1980; 46 years ago
- Founder: Li Ka-shing
- Type: Charitable trust
- Purpose: Education; Healthcare
- Headquarters: Hong Kong
- Region served: Global
- Website: www.lksf.org

Chinese name
- Simplified Chinese: 李嘉诚基金会
- Traditional Chinese: 李嘉誠基金會
Transcriptions
Standard Mandarin
- Hanyu Pinyin: Lǐjiāchéng Jījīn Huì

The Li Ka Shing Foundation (simplified Chinese: 李嘉诚基金会; traditional Chinese: 李嘉誠基金會) is a Hong Kong-based charitable organization founded in 1980 by Hong Kong entrepreneur Li Ka-shing.

== Background ==
Li Ka-shing has described the Li Ka Shing Foundation as his “third son,” reflecting his long-term commitment to philanthropy. Through the foundation, he has pledged to allocate a substantial portion of his personal wealth to charitable activities and has encouraged greater philanthropic engagement among business leaders in Asia.

== Areas of activity ==
The foundation’s activities focus primarily on three areas:

- Promoting charitable giving and philanthropic initiatives
- Supporting educational development and academic research
- Funding medical research and healthcare-related services

== Contributions ==
Since its establishment, the foundation has funded projects related to education, healthcare, social services, and poverty alleviation. According to publicly reported figures, contributions have exceeded HK$30 billion, with a large proportion of projects located in Hong Kong and mainland China.

=== Hong Kong ===
The foundation has supported initiatives in Hong Kong including funding for universities, healthcare institutions, and social welfare organisations. In 2005, a donation of HK$1 billion was made to the Faculty of Medicine at the University of Hong Kong. The foundation has also supported programmes providing financial assistance for medical treatment and funding for research projects at local universities.

In 2019, the foundation established a HK$1 billion relief fund intended to assist small and medium-sized enterprises in sectors such as food services, retail, and tourism during a period of economic slowdown. During the COVID-19 pandemic, the foundation provided funding for medical research, protective equipment, and support programmes for healthcare workers.

The foundation has also supported cultural and educational initiatives in Hong Kong, including funding for the development of Tsz Shan Monastery and its associated cultural and museum facilities.

=== Mainland China ===
- Committing grants and contributions of over HK$12 billion to Shantou University and the Shantou University Medical College since its founding in 1981. Recent commitments include RMB 100 million annually to offer full-tuition academic scholarships for all undergraduate students starting with the incoming class of 2019—June 2019. (Long-term project)
- Annual Funding of RMB 52 million to support the Heart of Gold Nationwide Hospice Service Program, with has received over RMB 800 million in aggregate funding since 2001. (Long-term project)
- Initiated Hospice Service by Shantou Medical College in 1997 and extended to nationwide in 2002. To date, 32 Hospice Service centers are established.
- In 2002, the Cheung Kong Graduate School of Business was established to educate new generation of entrepreneur leaders.
- In 2008, Project New Life for cleft lip and palate surgeries started.
- In 2009, Pediatric Hernia Rehabilitation Program in Western China started.
- In 2010, Project Define – Rural women development was run to enhance women's leadership.
- In 2012, Love Ideas – Women's Project Guangdong started.
- Providing US$2 million in funding scale socio-economic impact through technological disruption and innovation in Zhejiang and Shanghai—February 2019.
- In February 2021, LKSF sponsored Shanghai's Little Pigeon Dancing Group's performance of Shanghai style children musical "Xiao Balazi".
- Through his Foundation, Mr Li Ka-shing donated on 26 July 2021 HK$20 million to the Liaison Office of the Central People's Government in the HKSAR special account for disaster relief to support Henan Province's flood relief efforts.
- In July 2022, LKSF made a donation of RMB 10 million to support the haemodialysis programme at SUMC First and Second Affiliated Hospitals.
- In April 2023, a donation of RMB 100 million was made by LKSF to support the construction of a new inpatient building of Chaozhou People's Hospital.
- In August 2023, HK$30 million was donated to support flood relief efforts in Beijing-Tianjin and Northeast China, and a donation of RMB 10 million was made to support the medical aid program for the underprivileged at the Shantou University Medical College Affiliated Hospitals.
- In December, LKSF donated HK$30 million to assist Gansu Earthquake relief efforts.

=== Overseas ===
- The Center for Learning at Stanford University School of Medicine in the US was open in 2010.
- Supported the establishment of Institute of Virology of University of Alberta in Canada in 2009.
- Center for Biomedical and Health Sciences of UC Berkeley in the US opened in 2011.
- Oxford University "Big Data" Conference was established in 2013.
- In 2013, sponsored US$130 million to create Guangdong Technion-Israel Institute of Technology with the cooperation between Technion – Israel Institute of Technology and Shantou University. The new institute aims to bring a new era of research and innovation in science, engineering, and life science in China.
- In 2013, granted a C$6.6 million donation for student and faculty exchanges between McGill University and Shantou University in China.
- Offered a grant of $2 million to University of California San Francisco (UCSF) to advance precision medicine and create a partnership between UCSF and Shantou University, also in 2013.
- In 2015, renewed support for Yale Stem Cell Center (YSCC) with a US$1.86 million grant for education and healthcare in 2015.
- Donated total HK$27.6 million to the University of Auckland Campaign For All Our Futures in 2016.
- Donated US$3 million for cancer research & precision oncology to the University of Melbourne Centre for Cancer Research (UMCCR) in 2017.
- Established The Li Ka Shing Foundation Lord Sandberg Memorial Scholarship for Hong Kong students in memory of Lord Michael Sandberg of Passfield in King's College London (United Kingdom).
- Sponsoring the Future Now excursion to Australia for an experimental education and exchange program—September 2019.
- Contributing US$1 million to support Saildrone's Antarctic circumnavigation, while making the real-time data available to students for next-gen ocean research—January 2019.
- A$4.5 million to the University of Sydney to support Australia's first clinical trial testing CAR T-cell immunotherapy in patients with advanced pancreatic cancer—November 2018.
- Two Li Ka Shing Chair Professors – Professor Michael Houghton at the University of Alberta and Professor Jennifer Doudna at the University of California, Berkeley – have been awarded the 2020 Nobel Prize in Medicine and Chemistry respectively. Mr Li Ka-shing attended virtual celebrations through Zoom, at which both professors presented to him replicas of their Nobel medals. After learning that Professor Houghton's two co-investigators, Dr. Qui-Lim Choo and Dr. George Kuo, had shared in the discovery but had not been awarded the Nobel Prize, Mr Li announced that the Li Ka Shing Foundation would honor Dr Choo and Dr Kuo with the same Nobel prize money of US380,000 each to recognize their contributions.
- In April 2021, an additional C$1 million to support the University of Ottawa to carry out chronic spinal cord injuries research on top of a contribution of C$1 million in support of research on biomaterials in 2019.
- In August 2023, a donation of US$25 million was made to support Philanthropy Asia Alliance to promote innovative solutions to address issues of Asian and global concern.
- In May 2024, LKSF donated US$4 million to establish Research Professorship in Hepatology and cancer research funds at the University of Michigan.
