= Shantou University =

Key comprehensive university in Shantou, Guangdong, China

Coordinates: 23.4156°N 116.63°E

- 汕头大学 (Chinese)
- Motto: 团结、勤奋、求实、创新
- Motto in English: Solidarity, Diligence, Practice, Innovation
- Type: Public
- Established: 1981; 45 years ago
- Affiliations: Guangdong-Hong Kong-Macao University Alliance (GHMUA); CDIO Initiative
- Endowment: HK$6 billion US$ 770 million
- President: Jiang hong
- Faculty: 1,602
- Students: 10,294
- Location: Shantou, Guangdong, China
- Campus: Main Campus Medical College
- Sponsor: Li Ka Shing Foundation
- Website: https://www.stu.edu.cn

Chinese name
- Simplified Chinese: 汕头大学
- Traditional Chinese: 汕頭大學
Transcriptions
Standard Mandarin
- Hanyu Pinyin: Shàntóu Dàxué
Yue: Cantonese
- Jyutping: saan3 tau4 daai6 hok6

Shantou University (Chinese: 汕头大学; pinyin: Shàntóu Dàxué; abbreviated STU) is a university under the provincial Project 211 program in Shantou, Guangdong. It was founded in 1981 with the approval of the State Council.

It is the only public university in China that receives funding from the Li Ka Shing Foundation.

It is supported by the Ministry of Education (MOE), the Guangdong Provincial Government and the Li Ka Shing Foundation.

== History ==
Shantou University (STU) was founded in 1981 and started student enrollment in 1983. It is the only institution of higher education in the Chaoshan area.

STU, a key comprehensive university under the provincial Project 211 program, was founded in 1981 with the approval of the State Council. As the only public university that receives long-term funding from the Li Ka Shing Foundation, it is jointly supported by the Ministry of Education, the Guangdong Provincial Government and the Li Ka Shing Foundation. The Li Ka Shing Foundation has committed and donated a total of HK$5.4 billion to support Shantou University (including the Cheung Kong Graduate School of Business), of which HK$4.2 billion has already been donated as of 2012.

STU is planning to relocate the Medical College into the main campus and to develop a globally advanced curriculum focusing on life science. Since 2001, the University has conducted a profound internationalization-oriented reform, and overseas talents have been recruited to serve as provost, vice president and deans. Through a series of reforms in curriculum design, teaching, resources management and human resources system, it aims to offer a platform for the exploration of higher educational reform in China.

STU is strongly supported by the Central, Provincial, and Municipal authorities. The Current General secretary visited the university in the early 1990s. Former General secretary Jiang Zemin paid two visits to the university and wrote the following inscription as praise and encouragement to the staff and students: "The mission is demanding and the journey ahead is long." Other leaders of the Central Government have also visited the university. Among them are Chinese President and General Secretary of the Communist Party Hu Jintao, Premier Li Peng, NPC (National People's Congress), Chairman Qiao Shi, CPPCC Chairman Li Ruihuan, Vice Premier Li Lanqing and Vice Governor of Guangdong Wang Yang.

In 2012, the Ministry of Education, the Guangdong Provincial Government and the Li Ka Shing Foundation signed a tripartite agreement to co-develop STU. The agreement was reached to support STU’s continuing reform efforts geared to an internationally renowned and nationally elite university.

=== Institution ===
Organization Structure of Shantou University (As of May 2014)

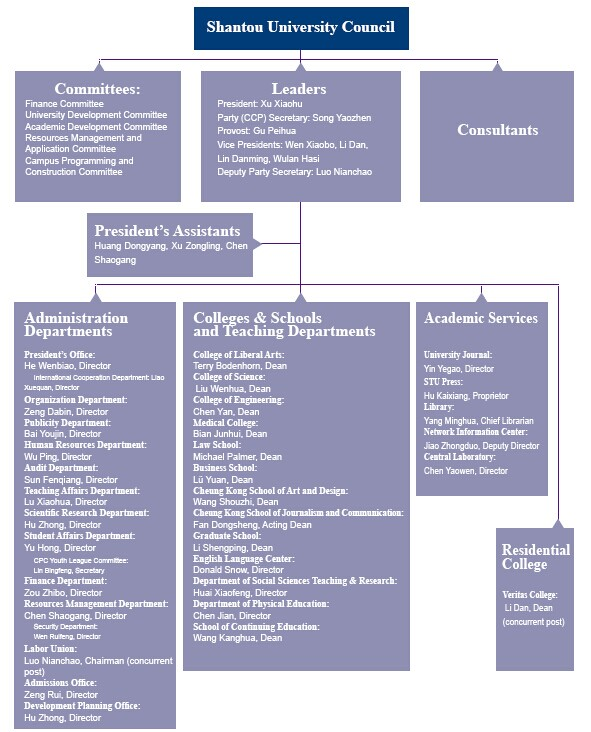

Current Student Enrollment

Types of students		Current students			Graduates		
		Subtotal	Main Campus	Medical College	Cumulative total from 1985 to 2013	Main Campus	Medical College
Bachelor's degrees		7,280	5,816	1,464	36,016	31,115	4,901
Overseas Students		27	21	5	1	-	1
Master’s Degrees		2,204	1,208	996	4,697	2,472	2,225
Doctoral Degrees		145	53	92	206	56	150
Subtotal		9,656	7,098	2,557	40,920	33,643	7,277
Continuing Education	Total	17,935	8,611	9,324	32,223	15,882	16,341
	4-year Program	5,453	2,414	3,039	9,352	3,692	5,660
	3-year Program	12,482	6,197	6,285	22,871	12,190	10,681
Grand total		27,591	15,709	11,881	73,143	49,525	23,618

== History ==
=== Background of Establishment ===
With the support and assistance of the Li Ka Shing Foundation and government officials at all levels, STU has achieved rapid development in the past three decades. Relations between the Li Ka Shing Foundation and University Communist party officials have soured over the years with significant conflict occurring in 2018 and 2019. As of 2019 the Li Ka Shing Foundation no longer has an office on campus.

- On August 26, 1983, the State Council granted permission to establish STU.
- In 1983, STU began to enroll undergraduate students, and the Ministry of Education approved Shantou Medical Vocational School to be merged into STU and renamed Shantou University Medical College (SUMC).
- On January 1, 1984, the STU foundation stone-laying ceremony was held.
- On June 20, 1986, Deng Xiaoping received Mr. Li Ka-shing in Beijing and suggested that STU should develop along freer lines and gradually attain the status of a national key university.
- On February 10, 1987, the STU Council was established.
- On February 8, 1990, the STU inauguration ceremony was held.
- In 1991, STU was listed among the universities to enroll students with scores above the first-round undergraduate admission cut-off mark.
- In 1993, STU was authorized to conduct Master’s programs.
- In 1998, STU was authorized to offer doctoral programs.
- In 2001, STU started its comprehensive educational reform.
- In 2001, the “Sunshine Finance” reform was launched.
- In 2001, the Preclinical Medicine Center for post-doctoral studies was established.
- In 2002, Pathology and Pathophysiology were approved by the MOE as a National Key Discipline.
- In 2002, the Credit System Reform and English Enhancement Program were launched.
- In 2002, the system-based integrated medical curriculum was implemented.
- In 2006, the EIP-CDIO engineering educational reform was initiated.
- In 2007, the reform of the faculty’s annual-salary system was conducted.
- In 2008, STU was approved by the Ministry of Education to admit students who are recommended for master's degree programs without taking the exam.
- In 2008, the pilot project of residential college system reform was launched, and the full-range undergraduate residential college, Veritas College, was established.
- In 2009, STU was Designated by the GD Government as a pilot university for transforming into a self-governing institution of higher education.
- In 2011, STU’s proposed program of transform itself into a self-governing institution of higher education and conducting Medical Educational Reform was designated as the “Guangdong Pilot Project of Comprehensive Educational Reform”.
- In 2011, Integrative Thinking core curriculum was designed for freshmen enrolled in 2011.
- In 2012, each undergraduate student was required to take a community service course.
- In 2012, the Business School’s Business Administration Degree Program was the first in Asia to pass the international accreditation of EPAS – EFMD (European Foundation for Management Development) Programme Accreditation System.
- In June 2012, the Ministry of Education, the Guangdong Provincial Government and the Li Ka Shing Foundation signed a tripartite agreement to co-develop STU.
- In 2013, STU was listed by the Ministry of Education of China as a mainland China partner university in “The Faculty and Students Exchange Programme between Universities in Hong Kong and Mainland China”.

=== Leadership ===
- Honorary Chairman of Shantou University Council: Li Ka-Shing
- Chairmen of Shantou University Council: Wu Nansheng, Lu Zhonghe, Li Hongzhong, Song Hai, and Chen Yunxian (current Chairman)
- Honorary President: Xu Dixin
- Presidents: Xu Dixin, Yang Yingqun, Dai Jingchen, Lin Weiming, Zhang Xiangwei, and Xu Xiaohu (current President)
- Party Secretaries: Lin Chuan, Yang Yingqun, Lin Weiming, Huang Zanfa, Xie Liangao, and Song Yaozhen (current Party Secretary)

== Campus ==
Shantou University is located at the foot of Sangpu Mountain and covers an area of 1.26 km^{2} with a total floor space of 455,500m^{2}.

=== New Library ===
The STU new library, constructed with an investment from the Li Ka Shing Foundation of about 200 million RMB, was inaugurated and put into service in 2009. It is reputed as “the most beautiful university library in Asia”. The new library was designed by Ray Chen (陈瑞宪). Situated at the core of the library is the Grate Hall of Reading.

With a total area of 21,000 square meters, the library features 1500 seats and 27 seminar rooms, and also has an exhibition room, lecture hall, conference center and Student Lounge. The library is covered with a wireless LAN to facilitate online journals database access. It took the lead in China in applying the UHF RFID technology to its book circulation as well as book sorting and checking. Total collections exceed 1,743,000 volumes or items, and the Chaoshan Literature Collection is listed in the project CADAL-China Academic Digital Associative Library, a national digital library project co-sponsored by the Ministry of Education, Ministry of Finance and National Development and Reform Commission.

The statue entitled “Looking up • Looking down”, one of the masterpieces of the British sculptor Zadok Ben-David, is placed near the entrance to the library.

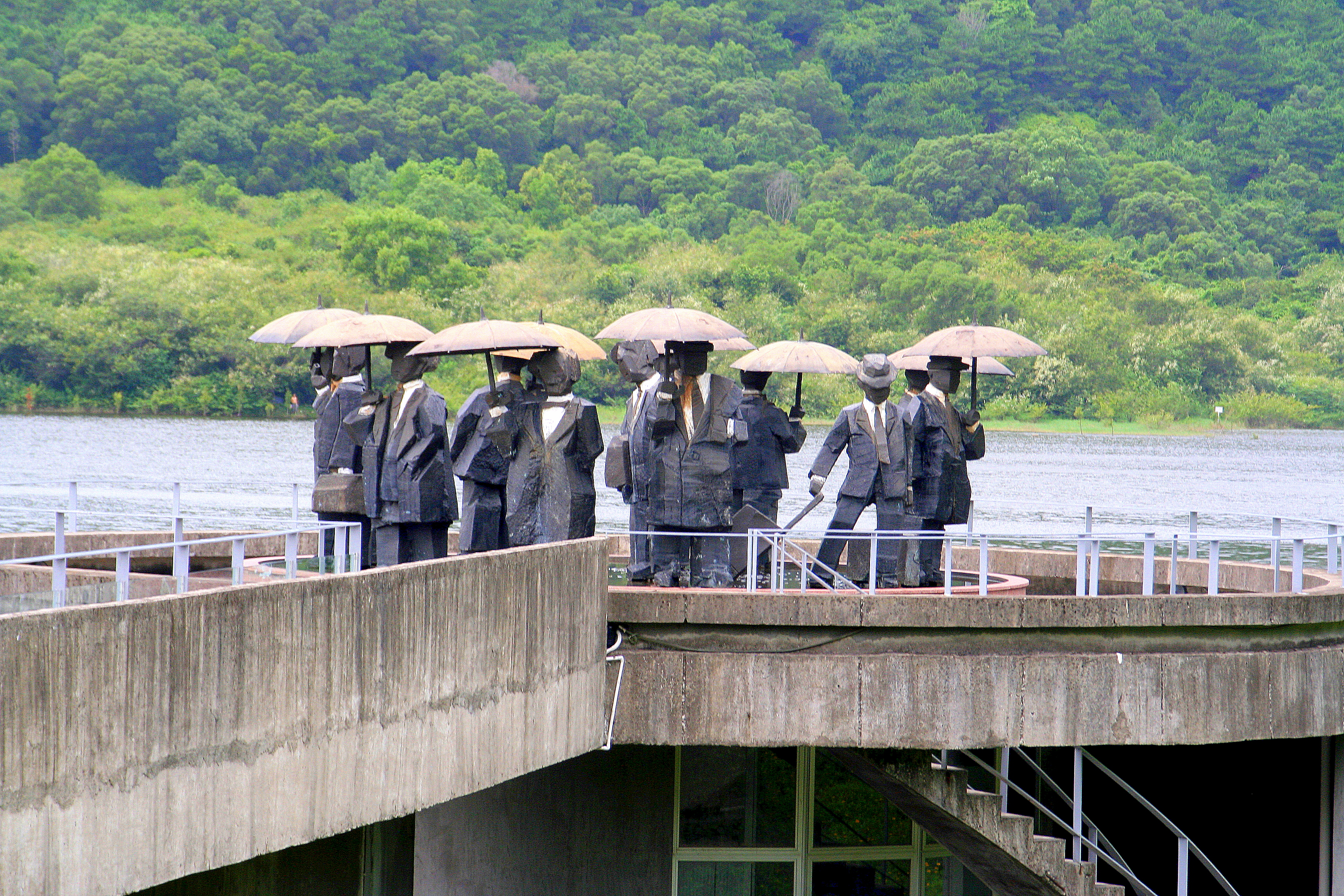
Ju Ming's "Living World".

=== Ju Ming’s Sculpture Series “Living World” ===
In June 2006, the bronze sculpture series, “Living World” from Ju Ming, a famous Taiwanese sculptor, was positioned besides the picturesque reservoir on STU campus. The lower part of the cylinder-shaped building that holds the sculpture is constructed as a half-open reservoir working room.

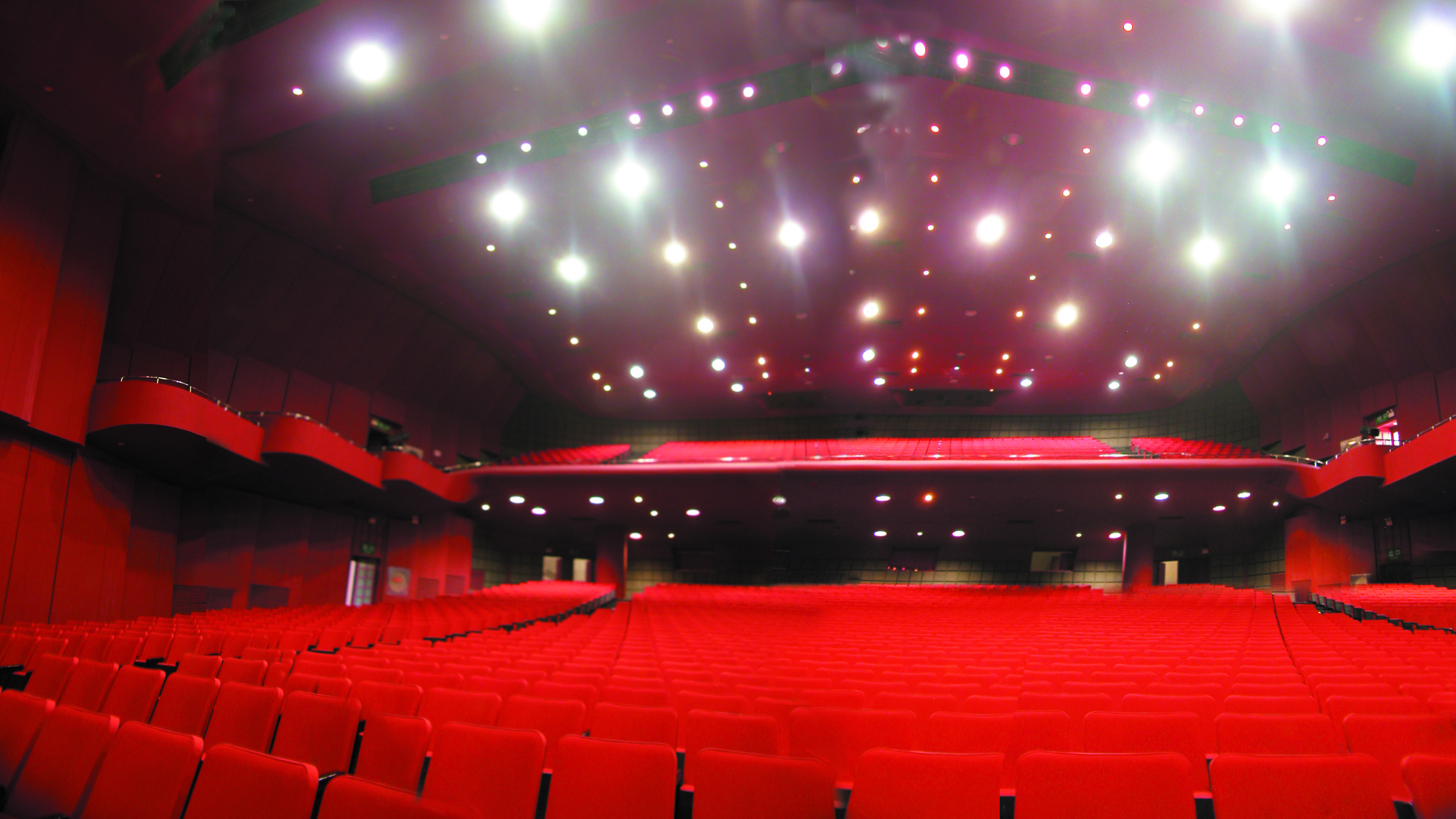
The interior of the Great Hall.

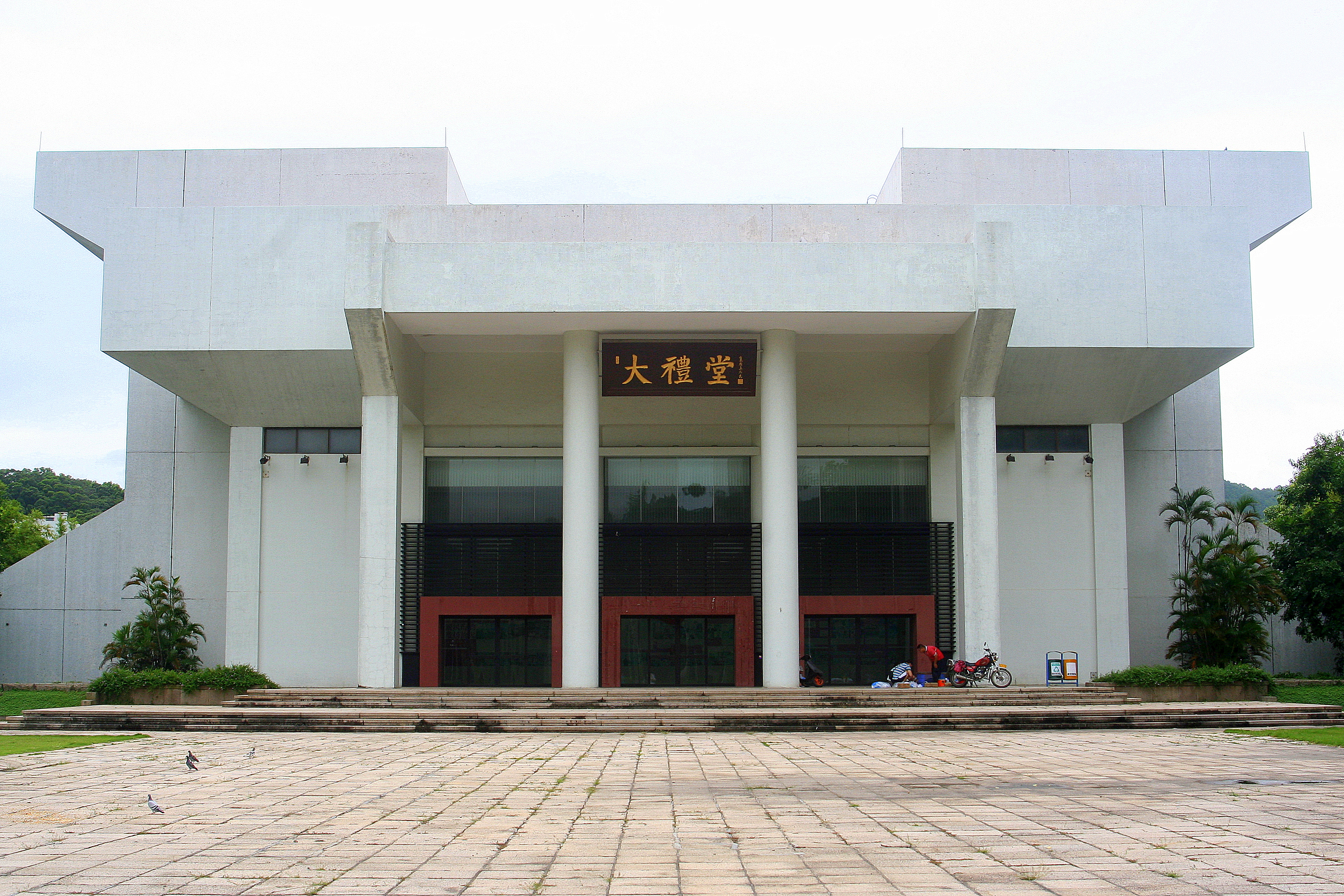
The Great Hall.

=== The Great Hall ===
The Great Hall, also known as the auditorium, has a total area of over 5,600m^{2} and a seating capacity of 1,798. It is equipped with advanced lighting, audiovisuals, and air conditioning.

=== Block A ===
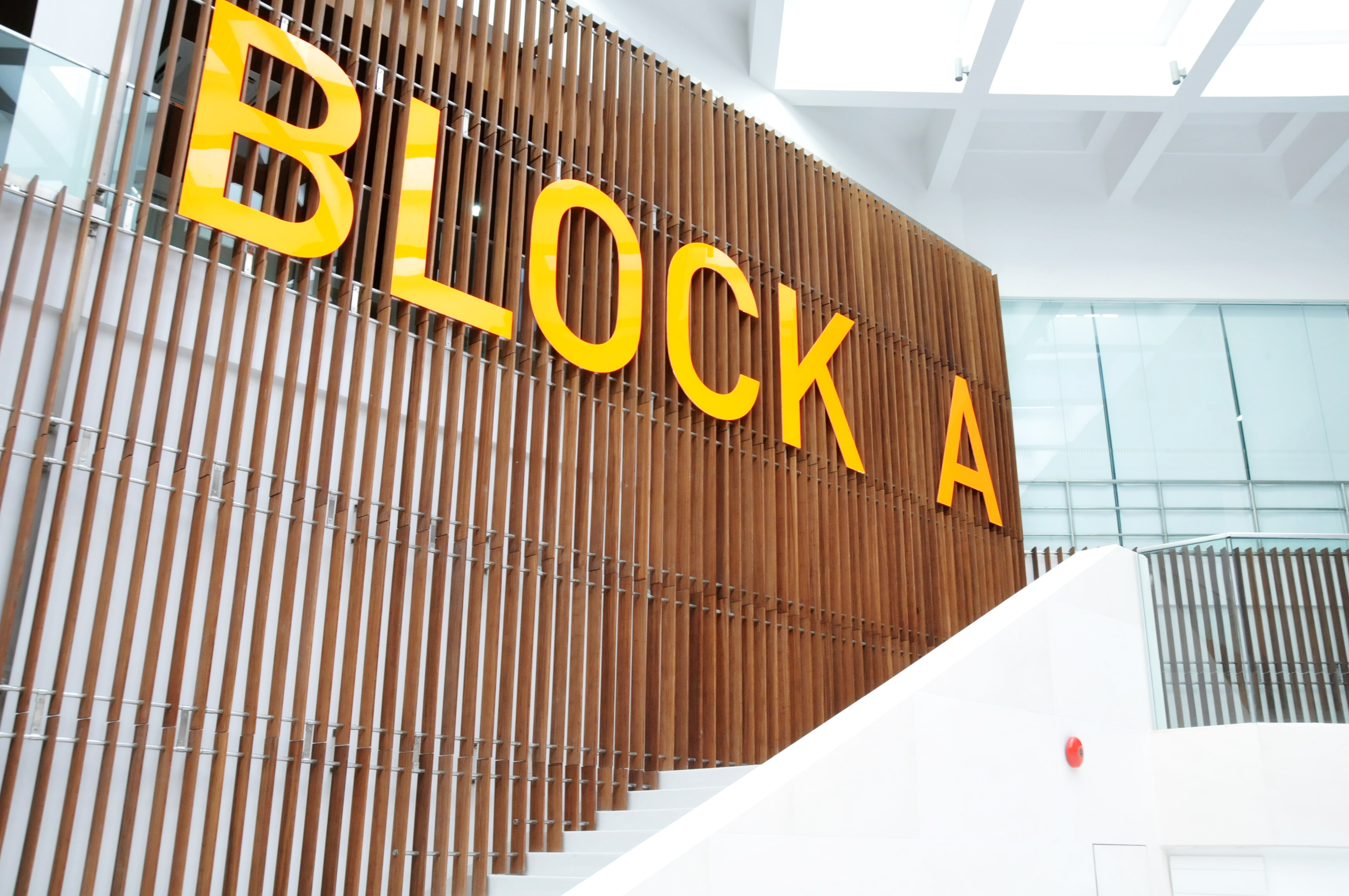
The new administrative building of Shantou University

Block A, STU’s new administrative building, was inaugurated by Mr. Li Ka-Shing on June 28, 2012. The building covers a total area of 5,545m^{2} and has a floor space of 16,319 m^{2}.

=== Academic Conference Center (ACC) ===
The academic conference center was designed by William Chang Suk Ping (张叔平). The ACC has over 50 rooms and conference halls.

=== STU Sports Park ===
On June 29, 2012, a special ceremony was held to launch the STU sports arena project at its construction site. The Sports Park is designed to cover an area of 60,868.6m^{2} and has a total construction area of 52,127.4m^{2}. It includes a 6,000-seat multi-use arena, a natatorium with pool, sport and fitness training facilities, a conference hall, a 200-room hotel and a car park for 200 vehicles. The sports arena is known as“High Park”. Li Ka Shing Foundation will offer full funding for the Construction Project, which is estimated as 350 million RMB. The construction project was scheduled to be completed in 2015. The sports arena will serve as a platform in support of STU’s whole-person education.

== Colleges and Schools ==
Shantou University consists of the following colleges and schools:

- College of Liberal Arts
- College of Science
- College of Engineering
- Medical College
- Law School
- Business School (Cheung Kong Graduate School of Business)
- Cheung Kong School of Journalism and Communications
- Cheung Kong School of Art and Design
- School of Continuing Education
- Veritas College (residential college)
- English Language Center

=== College of Liberal Arts ===
Dean: Mao Sihui

Department of Chinese Language and Literature	Chinese Language and Literature；Chinese as a Second Language	Director of General Office: Qiu Dongyang
Department of Foreign Language and Literature	English	Director of General Office: Qiu Dongyang

=== College of Science ===
Dean: Liu Wenhua

Department of Mathematics	Mathematics and Applied Mathematics	Director of General Office: Lin Yu
Department of Physics	Applied Physics	Director of General Office: Lin Yu
Department of Chemistry	Applied Chemistry	Director of General Office: Lin Yu
Department of Biology	Biotechnology	Director of General Office: Lin Yu

=== College of Engineering ===
Dean: Chen Yan

Department of Computer Science	Computer Science and Technology	Director of General Office: Deng Yong
Department of Power Engineering	Power Engineering Information	Director of General Office: Deng Yong
Department of Civil Engineering	Civil Engineering	Director of General Office: Deng Yong
Department of Mechanical Electronic Engineering	Machine Design and Manufacturing and Automation, Communication Engineering	Director of General Office: Deng Yong

As the first CDIO (Conceive, Design, Implement, and Operate) member in China, the College has adopted the new EIP-CDIO (EIP stands for Ethics, Integrity, and Professionalism) educational model in line with the international practices related to engineering education.

=== Law School ===
Dean: Huai Xiaofeng

Department of Law	Law	Director of General Office: Zheng Shunqin
Department of Public Management	Public Administration	Director of General Office: Zheng Shunqin
Department of Public Management	Public Utilities Management	Director of General Office: Zheng Shunqin

Based on the international approach of education called PLEASE (Professor, Language, Edited textbook, Activities, Disciplines and Employment), the School adopts bilingual and English immersed teaching modes for various programs including Alternative Dispute Resolution (ADR), which received the accreditation of the Hong Kong International Administration Centre. The curriculum for the program of Public Administration is designed to help develop professionals for international public administration projects.

=== Business School ===
Dean: Lu Yuan

Department of Management Studies	Business Administration, Marketing	Director of General Office: Zhou Xiao'e
Department of Economics	International Economics and Trade, Finance	Director of General Office: Zhou Xiao'e
Department of Accounting	Accounting	Director of General Office: Zhou Xiao'e

In response to the requirements set by the accreditation authorities at home and abroad, the School is engaged in developing a distinctive teaching model that incorporates theories, arts, and techniques. Composed of interrelated disciplines, the curriculum focuses on advanced economic and management theories and practices, as well as the analysis of successful cases of domestic enterprises. To help develop new business professionals with morality, aspiration and power, the School has also set up the Chinese (esp. Chao-Shan) Business Case Bank, the Practice Base and Innovation Base for students, which helps to appropriately combine teaching theory, vocational training and student practicing.

=== Medical College ===
Dean: Bian Junhui

Department of Clinical Medicine	Clinical Medicine	Director of General Office: Zeng Yang
Department of Nursing	Nursing Studies	Director of General Office: Zeng Yang

With the implementation of the new paradigm of “system-based integrated teaching,” the College offers English-immersed courses to educate students in clinical medicine, medical ethics, scientific research and innovation, so as to develop practical medical abilities with high overall competence and innovation.

As of 2026, the United Kingdom's General Medical Council (GMC) lists Shantou University Medical College on its official register of "Overseas medical qualifications we do not accept." This designation is applied after a full investigation by the GMC, which concludes that qualifications from the institution do not meet the GMC's criteria for acceptable overseas Primary Medical Qualifications (PMQs).

=== Cheung Kong School of Journalism and Communication ===
Dean: Fan Dongsheng

Department of Journalism and Communication	Broadcast Journalism	Director of General Office: Li Jing
Department of Journalism and Communication	Journalism	Director of General Office: Li Jing
Department of Journalism and Communication	Editing and Publishing	Director of General Office: Li Jing
Department of Journalism and Communication	Advertising	Director of General Office: Li Jing

With the reference to Columbia University’s and University of Missouri’s programs, the School develops a “fundamental but practical” curriculum, with international and practice-oriented features. It adopts the worldwide used curriculum system of “Platform Module” and offers small-group classes, English-immersed, and bilingual courses. It is also developing a four-year discipline in Journalistic English. The Pulitzer Prize-winning journalist Peter Arnett has taught at the school since 2007.

=== Cheung Kong School of Art and Design ===
Dean: Wang Shouzhi

Department of Design	Art and Design	Administrative Director: Heidi Lee
Department of Fine Arts	Fine Arts	Administrative Director: Heidi Lee
Department of Art and Design	Art and Design Philosophy	Administrative Director: Heidi Lee

=== School of Continuing Education ===
Dean: Wang Kanghua

Vocational Program for High School Graduates	17 disciplines	Director of General Office: Chen Wenguang
Undergraduate Program for Vocational School Graduates	10 disciplines	Director of General Office: Chen Wenguang

=== Veritas College ===
Dean: Li Dan

In July 2008, Shantou University established Veritas College, a residential college.

=== English Language Center ===
Director: Mao Sihui

The English Language Center (ELC) was founded in 2003. The ELC provides English training for all students at Shantou University's main campus. The core of its program consists of a two-year series of required courses. The ELC also offers elective courses which are aimed at more specialized skills (debate, speech, academic writing, etc.). The ELC organizes many co-curricular activities.

=== Affiliated Hospitals ===
First Affiliated Hospital of Shantou University Medical College	Tan Xuerui, Director
Second Affiliated Hospital of Shantou University Medical College	Wang Changzhi, Director
Affiliated Cancer Hospital of Shantou University Medical College	Zhang Guojun, Director
The Mental Health Center of Shantou University	Huang Qingjun, Director
Joint Shantou International Eye Center of Shantou University and The Chinese University of Hong Kong	Peng Peizhi, Director

=== English Enhancement Program ===
In May 2002, the English Language Center (ELC) was set up and the “English Enhancement Program” was initiated to reform English language teaching designed for university-wide students who would like to pass CET.

=== EIP-CDIO Approach of Engineering Education ===
In 2005, upon thorough investigations on CDIO (Conceive, Design, Implement and Operate) approach and local needs in China, and referring to the successful experience of engineering educational reform in Canada, STU decided to adopt the CDIO Initiative. To adapt to the local needs, the University determined to use a design directed EIP-CDIP approach. EIP stands for Ethics, Integrity and Professionalism. In 2006, STU became the first CDIO member among Chinese universities. In 2010, STU was selected by the Ministry of Education to be among the first group of universities to conduct the “Outstanding Engineer Education Program”.

=== International Accreditation for Undergraduate Programs ===
STU continued to promote its work concerning international accreditation for its undergraduate programs. In 2011, the Business School’s BBA (Bachelor of Business Administration) program was granted EFMD Programme Accreditation System (EPAS) accreditation, the first university in Asia to pass this kind of accreditation.

=== Whole-person Education ===
In 2008, STU established the first full-range residential college for undergraduate students in mainland China, Veritas College, where students from different majors live together.

== Program Development and Research ==
Shantou University has 1 National Key Discipline, offers Cheung Kong Scholar Professorships, provides 3 Postdoctoral Programs, 1 Doctoral Program for first-level discipline and 25 Doctoral Programs for second-level disciplines, 10 Master’s Programs for first-level disciplines and 84 Master’s Programs for second-level disciplines, as well as 6 Professional master's degree Programs. It also has 1 National Key Laboratory and 5 Provincial Key Laboratories, 2 National Pilot Sites for Innovative Talents Training, 7 National Distinctive Programs, as well as 4 Provincial Branded Programs. The University now offers a comprehensive education system from bachelor to doctorate programs, including a 7-year master program in Clinical Medicine. Currently, STU has a staff of 5,113 and over 9,450 students and has nurtured nearly 70,000 graduates. The University consists of ten colleges and schools, namely, College of Liberal Arts, College of Sciences, College of Engineering, Medical College, Law School, Business School, Cheung Kong School of Art and Design, Cheung Kong School of Journalism and Communication, Graduate School, School of Continuing Education and Veritas College. It enrolls qualified students from all over the country (including Special Administrative Regions of Hong Kong and Macau, as well as Taiwan). STU has established centers and laboratories, which conduct basic scientific research and directly serve local economic development, including the Artificial Intelligence Manufacturing Technology Laboratory funded by the Ministry of Education, STU Division of National Key Discipline in Molecular Pathology, Research Institute of Tumor Pathology, Marine Biology Laboratory of Guangdong Province, Image-processing Technology Key Laboratory of Guangdong Province, CAD/CAM Center, Laboratory for Wind Tunnel Testing, Laboratory for Structural Engineering, FMS Laboratory and Institute for Artificial Intelligence and Pattern Recognition.

In 2011, STU obtained 70,308,100 RMB in total funding for research projects, an increase of 45.8% over the previous year. Altogether, 54 projects were awarded a cumulative total of 27,547,000 RMB from the National Natural Science Foundation of China (NSFC) and the National Social Sciences Foundation. The national-level funding received was up by over 60%.

According to the statistics released by The Institute of Scientific and Technical Information of China (ISTIC) in December 2012, the average impact factor of SCIE-indexed periodicals where STU faculty and staff published their papers was raised from 1.92 in 2007 to 2.59 in 2011, which is historically high. STU ranked top for its paper citation counts in the “2012 Chinese Universities Nature & Science Publications Ranking”. In 2012, STU won the funding for major projects of cultural industry in Guangdong Province for the first time, and STU faculty were awarded the Funding for MOE New Century Outstanding Talents in humanities and social sciences for the first time.

== International Exchange and Cooperation ==
STU takes full advantage of the support from the Li Ka Shing Foundation and the ties with overseas universities to strengthen academic exchange and cooperation.

Under the auspice of the Li Ka Shing Foundation, STU has become one of the few universities in Mainland China that awards full scholarships to overseas exchange students. The university has established close academic ties with nearly 20 universities in such countries as the United States, United Kingdom, France, Japan, Russia, Australia and Germany, and launched exchange programs for undergraduates and graduate students.

Programs	Participants
Exchange program between Whitman College and Shantou University	All undergraduate
Shantou University and University of Calgary Global Leadership and Innovation Program	All undergraduate
Shantou University Students Oversea Studies Funding Scheme	All undergraduate
Student Exchange between Anhalt University of Applied Sciences (GE) and Shantou University	Cheung Kong School of Art and Design
Shantou University and University of Calgary CDIO Program	College of Engineering
Student Exchange between University of Manitoba and Shantou University	Business School
Student Exchange between Universidade Catòlica Portuguesa and Shantou University	Business School
Student Exchange between Dublin City University and Shantou University	College of Liberal Arts
Student Exchange between National University of Ireland, Galway and Shantou University	All colleges and schools
Student Exchange between University West and Shantou University	Business School, College of Engineering
Student Exchange between University of Northampton and Shantou University	Business School, Cheung Kong School of Art and Design
Student Exchange between Coventry University and Shantou University	Cheung Kong School of Journalism and Communication, College of Engineering, Cheung Kong School of Art and Design
Student Exchange between Victoria University and Shantou University	Business School
Internship program for selected students to work for Hong Kong and Macau press companies	Cheung Kong School of Journalism and Communication
Internship program with selected law firms in Hong Kong	Law School
To select students for short-term study in overseas universities (including Oxford University, UK; Ehime University, JP; University of Manitoba, CA; University of Toronto, CA; Chinese University of Hong Kong and Hong Kong Polytechnic University), or recommend and sponsor distinguished graduates for master’s programs in the University of Western Australia and Cambridge University.	Medical College
International Immunity and Infection Institute co-founded by SUMC, University Health Network (UNH) in Canada and Medical Faculty University of Hong Kong (HKU). To recommend graduate and undergraduate students with outstanding academic performance to study for an MSc in Global Health Sciences in the University of Oxford, a program funded by the Li Ka Shing Foundation. To fund graduate students for research training in University of Western Australia during summer vacation.	Medical College

== Notable people ==
- Du Gangjian, former Dean of the law school
