= Victor Li Tzar-kuoi =

Hong Kong businessman

Victor Li
- 李澤鉅
- Born: 1 August 1964 (age 62); Deep Water Bay, British Hong Kong
- Citizenship: Canada; China; (Hong Kong)
- Education: Stanford University (BS, MS)
- Occupation: Businessman
- Organization: Chinese People's Political Consultative Conference
- Office: Chair of CK Asset Holdings; Chair of CK Hutchison Holdings
- Predecessor: Li Ka-shing
- Spouse: Cynthia Wong
- Parent: Li Ka-shing
- Relatives: Richard Li (brother)

Li Tzar-kuoi
- Traditional Chinese: 李澤鉅
- Simplified Chinese: 李泽钜
Transcriptions
Standard Mandarin
- Hanyu Pinyin: Lǐ Zéjù
Yue: Cantonese
- Jyutping: Lei5 Zaak6 Geoi6

Victor Li Tzar-kuoi (born 1 August 1964) is a Hong Kong businessman, the chair of the board and group co-managing director of CK Hutchison Holdings Limited and the chairman of the board and managing director of CK Asset Holdings Limited and the chairman of CK Infrastructure Holdings Limited. He is the elder son of tycoon Li Ka-shing and the brother of Richard Li.

== Early life and education ==
Victor was born to Li Ka-shing, a Hong Kong billionaire businessman, at his parents' family house in 79 Deep Water Bay Road, Deep Water Bay, Hong Kong on 1 August 1964, He has a younger brother, Richard Li. He attended St. Paul's Co-educational College in Hong Kong, and earned B.S. and M.S. degree in civil engineering from Stanford University.

== Career ==
In March 2018, his father announced retirement and passed control of his US$100 billion empire to his son.

Victor Li has been holding the following positions:

- Chairman and Group Co-managing director of CK Hutchison Holdings Limited
- Chairman and managing director of CK Asset Holdings Limited
- Chairman of CK Infrastructure Holdings Limited
- Chairman of CK Life Sciences Int'l., (Holdings) Inc.
- Non-executive Director of Power Assets Holdings Limited
- Deputy Chairman of HK Electric Investments Limited
- Deputy Chairman of Li Ka Shing Foundation Limited, Li Ka Shing (Overseas) Foundation and Li Ka Shing (Canada) Foundation
- Co-Chairman of Husky Energy Inc.
- Director of the Hongkong and Shanghai Banking Corporation

== Personal life and kidnapping ==
Victor Li was kidnapped in 1996 on his way home after work by notorious gangster "Big Spender" Cheung Tze-keung. Victor's father, Li Ka-shing, paid a ransom of HK$1.038 billion, directly to Cheung who had come to Li Ka-shing's house. Victor Li is said to have been released after one night. A report was never filed with Hong Kong police. Instead the case was pursued by Mainland authorities, leading to Big Spender's execution in 1998, an outcome not possible under Hong Kong law. Rumours circulated of a deal between Li Ka-Shing and the Mainland. This suggestion, when brought to Li, was brushed off.

== Other positions ==
Victor Li is a member of the Standing Committee of the 13th National Committee of the Chinese People's Political Consultative Conference.

Li is a member of the Chief Executive's Council of Advisers on Innovation and Strategic Development of the Hong Kong Special Administrative Region. Li is the Vice Chairman of the Hong Kong General Chamber of Commerce, and is Honorary Consul, for Barbados in Hong Kong.

== See also ==
- List of kidnappings
