= Nga Ying Chau =

Former island of Hong Kong

Coordinates: 22.3621°N 114.1066°E

- Traditional Chinese: 牙鷹洲
- Simplified Chinese: 牙鹰洲
Transcriptions
Standard Mandarin
- Hanyu Pinyin: Yáyīngzhōu
Hakka
- Romanization: Nga2 yin1 ziu1
Yue: Cantonese
- Jyutping: Ngaa4 jing1 zau1
- Sidney Lau: Nga^{4} Ying^{1} Jau^{1}

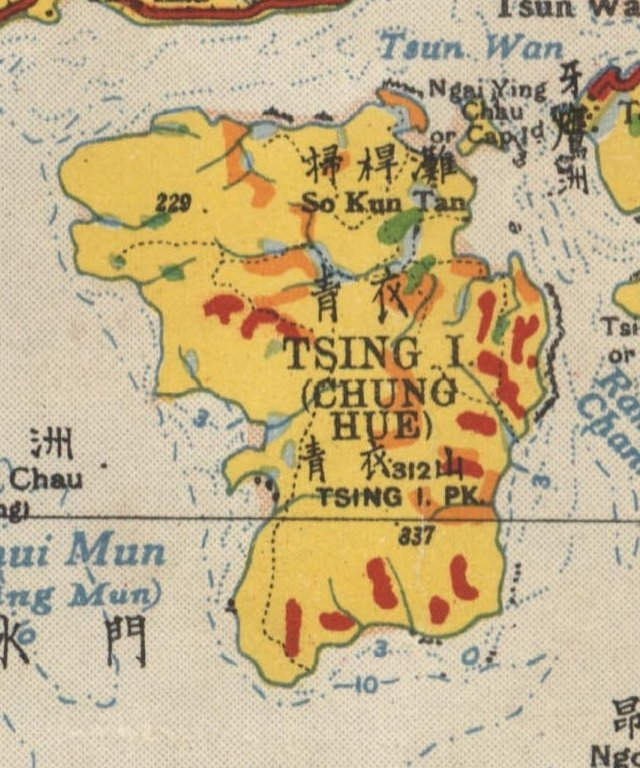
Nga Ying Chau was an island at the northeast of Tsing Yi Island (1936)

Nga Ying Chau, or Cap Island, was an island off the northeast shore of Tsing Yi Island of Hong Kong, separated by a small harbour, Mun Tsai Tong, with Tsuen Wan at its northeast, just across the Rambler Channel. When the small harbour was reclaimed for the development of a new town, the island became part of Tsing Yi Island. The island was once home to the CRC Oil Storage Depot, which later relocated to the other side of Tsing Yi Island owing to the previous site's proximity to the residential area. The former island is now a small hill on the northeast point of Tsing Yi Island, and Villa Esplanada, a private housing estate, stands on the hill.

There is also a park called Nga Ying Chau Garden in the vicinity of the former island.

== See also ==
- List of islands and peninsulas of Hong Kong
- List of places in Hong Kong
