= CK Asset Holdings =

Hong Kong property developer

CK Asset Holdings Limited
- Type: Public
- Traded as: SEHK: 1113; Hang Seng Index component
- Industry: Property
- Predecessor: Cheung Kong Holdings; Hutchison Whampoa
- Founded: As Cheung Kong Holdings in 1950; 76 years ago; As CK Asset Holdings on 3 June 2015; 11 years ago
- Headquarters: 7/F, Cheung Kong Center, 2 Queen's Road Central, Hong Kong
- Key people: Victor Li Tzar-kuoi (Chairman and Managing Director)
- Products: real estate development and investment, aircraft leasing
- Subsidiaries: Cheung Kong Property Development Limited; Citybase Property Management Limited; Goodwell Property Management Limited; Harbour Plaza Hotel Management Limited; Hutchison Property Group Limited; Accipiter Holdings Designated Activity Company; Greene King
- Website: ckah.com

CK Asset Holdings Limited, formerly Cheung Kong Property Holdings Limited, is a property developer registered in the Cayman Islands, with its headquarters and principal place of business in Hong Kong.

== History ==
The company was established in 2015 when Cheung Kong Holdings spun off its property holdings into a separate company as part of a restructuring. CK Asset Holdings began trading on 3 June 2015. After restructuring, Cheung Kong Holdings and Hutchison Whampoa went private, replacing their major listed companies with CK Hutchison Holdings and CK Asset Holdings.

Immediately after restructuring, CK Asset Holdings became a constituent of the Hang Seng Index (the blue-chip index of the Hong Kong stock exchange).

== Acquisitions ==
In 2019, the company bought the UK pub company Greene King in a deal that valued the chain at £2.7 billion.

In May 2023, CK Asset Holdings agreed a £485 million cash takeover offer for Civitas Social Housing.

== Chairmen ==
=== List of chairmen ===
1. Li Ka-shing (1950–2018)
2. Victor Li (2018– )

=== List of senior advisors ===
1. Li Ka-shing (2018–present)
