= Cheung Kong Holdings =

Hong Kong conglomerate

Cheung Kong (Holdings) Limited 長江企業控股有限公司

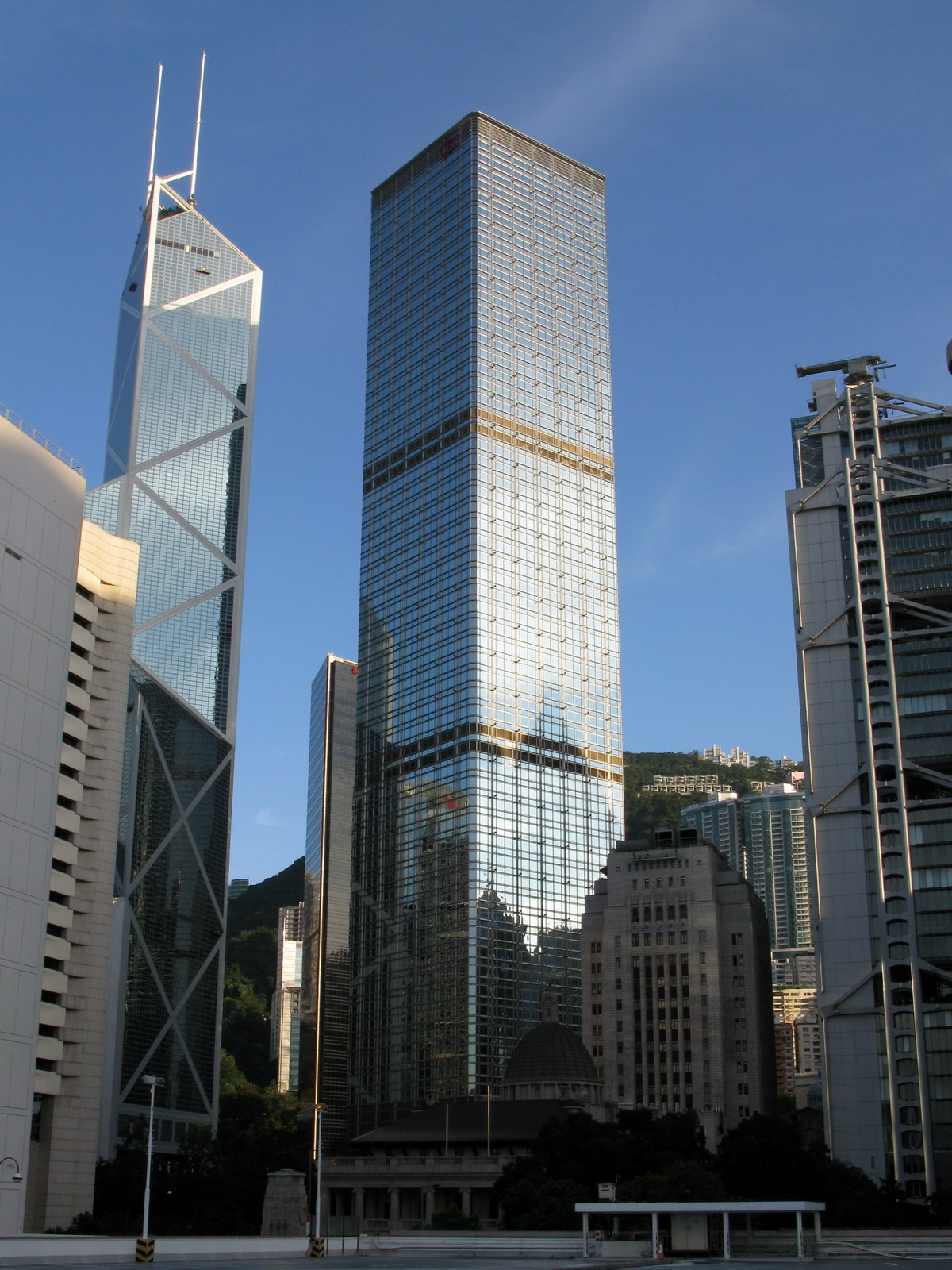
- Headquarters at the Cheung Kong Center
- Type: Private
- Industry: Conglomerate
- Founded: 1972; 54 years ago
- Headquarters: Cheung Kong Center, Hong Kong Island, Hong Kong
- Key people: Li Ka-shing (chairman); Victor Li Tzar-kuoi (Managing Director & vice chairman)
- Products: Real estate, Investment, life sciences, IT, Hotels, telecommunications; & internet
- Revenue: HK$32.863 billion (US$4.2 billion) (2010)
- Net income: HK$26.478 billion (US$3.4 billion) (2010)
- Number of employees: 9,500 (2010)
- Parent: CK Hutchison Holdings Limited
- Footnotes; Associates: Hutchison Whampoa; Cheung Kong Infrastructure Holdings Limited; Hutchison Asia Telecommunications and TOM Group

Cheung Kong Holdings
- Traditional Chinese: 長江實業 (集團) 有限公司
- Simplified Chinese: 长江实业 (集团) 有限公司
Transcriptions
Standard Mandarin
- Hanyu Pinyin: Chángjiāng Shíyè (Jítuán) Yǒuxiàn Gōngsī
Yue: Cantonese
- Jyutping: coeng4 gong1 sat6 jip6 zaap6 tyun4 jau5 haan6 gung1 si1

Cheung Kong (Holdings) Limited is a multinational conglomerate, based in Hong Kong. It was one of Hong Kong's leading multi-national conglomerates. The company merged with its subsidiary Hutchison Whampoa on 3 June 2015, as part of a major reorganisation, to become part of CK Hutchison Holdings.

The Chairman of Cheung Kong Holdings was Li Ka-shing, while his elder son, Victor Li, was managing director and deputy chairman. Li Ka-shing founded Cheung Kong Industries in the 1950s as a plastics manufacturer. Eventually the company evolved into a property investment company. Cheung Kong (Holdings) Limited was established in 1971.

The Cheung Kong Group develops residential, office, retail, industrial and hotel properties in Hong Kong, with a history of property development and residential estates. As part of a reorganisation, a new company composed of the group's property assets was spun-off in June 2015 as Cheung Kong Property Holdings.

== Component companies ==
The market capitalisation of the Cheung Kong Group's Hong Kong-listed companies amounted to HK$1,148 billion on 31 January 2015. The group operates in over 50 countries and employs over 240,000 staff worldwide.

The group had nine companies:

- Hutchison Whampoa Limited (SEHK: 13)
- Cheung Kong Infrastructure Holdings Limited (SEHK: 1038)
- Power Assets Holdings Limited (SEHK: 6)
- CK Life Sciences Int'l., (Holdings) Inc. (SEHK: 775)
- Hutchison Asia Telecommunications Limited
- TOM Group Limited (SEHK: 2383)

The company was first listed on the Hong Kong Stock Exchange in 1972 as Cheung Kong Holdings, and developed into a property development and strategic investment company, with interests in life sciences and other businesses.

The company and Sun Hung Kai Properties together became increasingly dominant in the development of new private homes, accounting for 70% of the market in 2010, up from around half of that in 2003. This concentration, with much of the rest of the market occupied by other very large firms, is attributed to the government's policy of auctioning land in expensive large blocks, squeezing out small and mid-sized firms, according to the Consumer Council.

=== Restructuring ===
In January 2015, Li Ka-shing confirmed the business would be restructured and its property business spun-off as a separately listed company, Cheung Kong Property. Under the plans, Cheung Kong Holdings purchased the shares in Hutchison Whampoa that it did not already own, and merged the companies under a new single holding company, CK Hutchison Holdings. The new holding company was established on 18 March 2015, based in the Cayman Islands, but listed in Hong Kong.

Hutchison Whampoa was delisted on 3 June 2015, on the same day that a new company comprising the group's existing property assets, Cheung Kong Property Holdings, began trading.

== Shareholdings ==
=== Telecommunications ===
The company operates mobile telephone services under the 3 brand in 10 countries, inherited from Hutchison Whampoa.

CK Hutchison's telecommunications subsidiaries in Hong Kong and Australia are listed companies; the company holds 66.09% and 87.87% stakes in these respectively.

=== Cheung Kong Infrastructure Holdings Ltd ===
The chairman of Cheung Kong Infrastructure Holdings Limited (CKI) is Victor Li Tzar-kuoi. CKI is the largest diversified infrastructure company listed on the Hong Kong Stock Exchange. It is a Hong Kong-based diversified infrastructure company, focused on the development, investment and operation of infrastructure businesses in countries such as China, Australia, and the United Kingdom.

CK Hutchison holds a 75.67% stake in the company.

=== Power Assets Holdings Limited ===
The chairman of Power Assets Holdings Limited is Canning Fok Kin-ning. The listed Hongkong Electric group of companies are

- The Hongkong Electric Company Limited (HEC),
- Hongkong Electric International Limited (HEI),
- Associated Technical Services Limited (ATS); and
- some minor subsidiaries.

The Hongkong Electric Company Limited mainly concentrates on the generation and supply of electricity on Hong Kong Island and Lamma Island. Hongkong Electric International Limited pursues overseas investment opportunities and Associated Technical Services Limited's principal activity is engineering consultancy and project management.

CK Hutchison holds a 38.87% stake in the company.

=== CK Life Sciences Int'l., (Holdings) Inc. ===
CK Life Sciences is engaged in the business of research and development, commercialisation, marketing and sale of biotechnology products. Products developed by CK Life Sciences are categorised into two areas, human health and environmental sustainability.

CK Hutchison holds a 45.32% stake in the company.

== Other investments ==
Apart from the core business of property development, CK Hutchison's ventures include TOM Group Limited. iMarkets Ltd, iBusiness Corporation Limited, CK Communications Ltd, Excel Technology International Holdings Ltd, mReferral Corporation (HK) Ltd and Beijing Net-Infinity Technology Development Co., Ltd.

Hutchison Whampoa's 34% stake in the Canadian energy company Husky Energy passed to CK Hutchison on completion of the merger.

== See also ==
- List of Chinese companies
- 3G
