= INQ Chat 3G =

British smartphone

- Manufacturer: INQ
- Availability by region: December 2009
- Predecessor: INQ1
- Successor: INQ Cloud Touch
- Related: INQ, INQ1, INQ Mini 3G
- Compatible networks: GPRS, EDGE, HSPDA
- Form factor: Candybar
- Dimensions: 114.5×61×12.8 mm (4.51×2.40×0.50 in)
- Weight: 122 g (4 oz)
- Operating system: INQ System1, based upon Qualcomm's BREW
- Memory: 175.6 megabytes
- Removable storage: microSD/microSDHC, up to 4 GB
- Battery: 1500mAh Li-ion Polymer
- Rear camera: 3.2 megapixels with autofocus
- Display: 2.4" TFT LCD, 256k colours
- Connectivity: Bluetooth v2.0 with A2DP, mini-USB v2.0
- Data inputs: Qwerty keypad

The INQ Chat 3G (occasionally dropping the '3G' to be called the INQ Chat) is a fully featured, 3G enabled "Candy Bar" smartphone created by the British manufacturer INQ, designed to easily interface with popular social media applications.

Dubbed the 'Twitter phone', the INQ Chat 3G features integrated Twitter, Facebook, Skype and Windows Live Messenger applications. The phone sports a full QWERTY keypad, a 3.2-megapixel camera and a 2.4-inch screen. The phone was launched alongside the INQ Mini 3G – both of which succeed the hugely successful INQ1.

== History ==
The BREW device was announced on 4 August 2009, and developed in response to consumer demand for a full QWERTY keypad layout device from INQ. The phone debuted on 30 November 2009 in Italy, with a Sweden launch shortly after on 7 December 2009. The INQ Chat 3G had a simultaneous UK and Hong Kong launch, on 11 December, 2009. It was later released in Singapore on 22 December 2009, and in India on 16 March 2010. The mobile phone has also been released in Australia on 2 July and in Canada on 27 July.

== Appearance ==
The phone features a red and black colour scheme, a full QWERTY keypad, a 2.4" QVGA TFT LCD screen, a mini-USB port, volume control buttons and a Switcher button (to switch between applications).

=== Artwork ===
INQ's packaging and instruction manual style is unique. The packaging the phone comes in is laden with artwork from various artists, and there is no manual as such, instead a set of 'Help Cards'. Each help card focusses on a particular part of the phone – for example Contacts, E-mail or Twitter – on one side, and then on the other side one of the many artworks selected by INQ. In their words: "We have collaborated with illustrators we love to turn our packaging and help cards into objects to cherish, not chuck."

Along with this, all of the artworks are included as images on the phone and can set as the wallpaper or screensaver if desired. The artwork use on the Chat 3G's box is by Matt Huynh. The artwork for all of INQ's phones can be seen here, along with an introduction to "INQ+Art", brief descriptions of each artist, their artwork and which phone it was used for. (Note: some artists have had more than one of their pieces used, and on multiple phones).

=== Battery Covers ===
Like the Mini 3G, the INQ Chat 3G's battery covers are interchangeable with other colours. The default is the red battery cover, but black, pink and yellow battery covers can be purchased at participating stores of the default network in the respective countries. In Canada, phones bought on Telus receive, two battery covers, a solid color and an artwork cover – feature either the artwork by Paul Vizzari or one of the pieces of artwork by Matt Huynh (different from the one use on the phone's box); both artworks feature on the back of the help cards.

Battery Covers	Red	Yellow	Pink	Black	Artwork	Artwork
Image	INQ Chat 3G - red cover	INQ Chat 3G - yellow cover	INQ Chat 3G - pink cover	INQ Chat 3G - black cover	INQ Chat 3G - Paul Vizzari cove	INQ Chat 3G - Matt Huynh cover
Notes	Default colour. This is branded by the network the phone is locked to. This one is branded on the Three network.	Available for purchase separately from the phone.			Artwork by Paul Vizzari, specially commissioned by Telus in Canada	Artwork by Matt Huynh, specially commissioned by Telus in Canada

On the reverse of all of the battery covers is a maze, and the Latin phrase "Audaces Fortuna Iuvat", meaning "fortune favours the brave", all leading to a mysterious secret embedded within the phone.

== Features ==
=== Software ===
==== General ====
- The user of the phone can display widgets on their home screen for quick and easy access to information. Widgets include Facebook, Twitter, Weather and RSS.
- Compatibility with doubleTwist.
- Option to use the phone as a mobile modem, either over USB or DUN Bluetooth.

==== Applications ====
Applications include, but are not limited to:

- Facebook
- Twitter
- Skype & Windows Live Messenger, which both make use of the free Skype and Messenger on selected Three networks
- Email, including free Push GMail, as well as supporting the IMAP4, POP3 and SMTP e-mail protocols.
- A media player, capable of playing Audio: AMR, AAC, AAC+, MIDI, MP3, WAV; Video: MPEG4, H.263, H.264
- Google Maps for Mobile, making use of the built-in GPS
- The NetFront browser, v3.5. In some countries, Opera Mini is the default browser instead.

==== Social Networking ====
The Chat 3G, as with all INQ phones, is built for social-networking, and it is highly integrated into the phone:

- When the user take a picture they are immediately given the option to post to Twitter, using Twitpic, or to Facebook.
- In the Contacts list, the user can assign social-networking profiles to a contact, including information about Facebook, Skype, Windows Live Messenger and e-mail. The contacts list then displays the Facebook or Windows Live Messenger profile picture, including the latest 'status update' from Facebook if the user is logged into the Facebook client. It also displays a small icon showing whether they are logged into Skype or Windows Live Messenger.

=== Hardware ===
Feature	Specification
Screen	2.4" QVGA, 256k colours, 320x240 pixels
Band	Tri, GSM 900 / 1800 / 1900
3G	Yes, with enhanced '3.5G', HSDPA. (2100)
Size	114.5 x 61 x 12.8 mm
Weight	122 g
Internal Memory	175.6mb
Camera	3.2megapixel, 2048x1536 pixels with autofocus
Memory card slot	Yes, microSD/microSDHC
Bluetooth	Yes, 2.0 + EDR; supports most profiles, including A2DP for stereo audio and control and DUN to use phone as a modem for internet tethering from other devices.
GPS	Yes
Wi-Fi	No
Infrared	No
Data cable support	Yes, USB 2.0 via mini USB port
FM radio	No
Battery	1500 mAh, Ion-Polymer
Talk time	588 minutes
Standby time	355 hours

== Carriers ==
INQ is owned by Hutchison Whampoa, which own Hutchison 3G; because of this the phone is usually carried on the 3 network where possible. INQ have adopted a style whereby they launch their phones on one network in that country. There are exceptions (i.e. Australia & Canada), but these are where the networks are commercially linked.

The INQ Chat 3G is currently carried on the following networks:

- 3 Denmark
- 3 Hong Kong
- (Republic of Ireland) 3 Ireland
- 3 Italy
- 3 Sweden
- 3 United Kingdom
- (India) Aircel
- (Singapore) SingTel
- Vodafone Australia and 3 Australia, both part of the Vodafone Hutchison Australia Group.
- (Canada) Telus and Koodo Mobile (which is a subsidiary of Telus)
