= 3 Hong Kong =

Internet service provider in Hong Kong

- 3HK logo

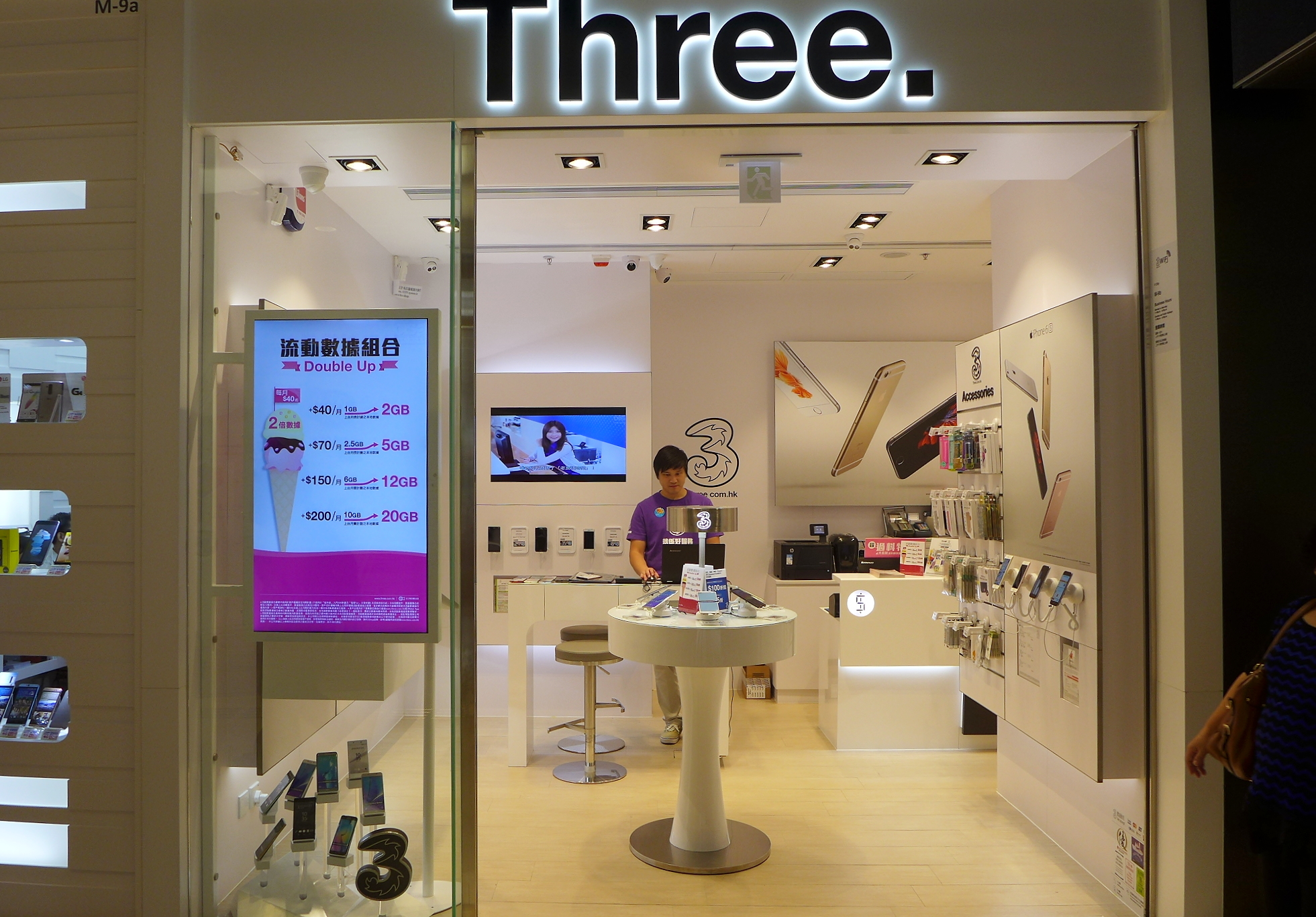
- A 3 Store in Tuen Mun, Hong Kong
- Formerly: Hutchison Telecom Hong Kong
- Type: Subsidiary
- Industry: Mobile telecommunications, Broadband internet access
- Predecessor: Orange
- Founded: 1984; 42 years ago
- Area served: Hong Kong
- Owner: CK Hutchison Holdings
- Parent: Hutchison Telecommunications; Hong Kong
- Website: www.three.com.hk

3 Hong Kong (also known as 3HK or Three HK; Chinese: 3香港; Jyutping: saam1 hoeng1 gong2) is a telecommunications and internet service provider operating in Hong Kong by Hutchison Telecommunications Hong Kong Holdings, a subsidiary of CK Hutchison, operating under the global Three brand. 3 Hong Kong is the first Three-branded company, leading to the development of other operations in different locations.

The company was founded in 1984 but was officially named as 3 Hong Kong in 2002. It currently provides 5G, 4.5G, 4G LTE, 3G, GSM dual-band mobile telecommunications and Wi-Fi services through its own network infrastructure. 3HK also provides gaming and home entertainment services.

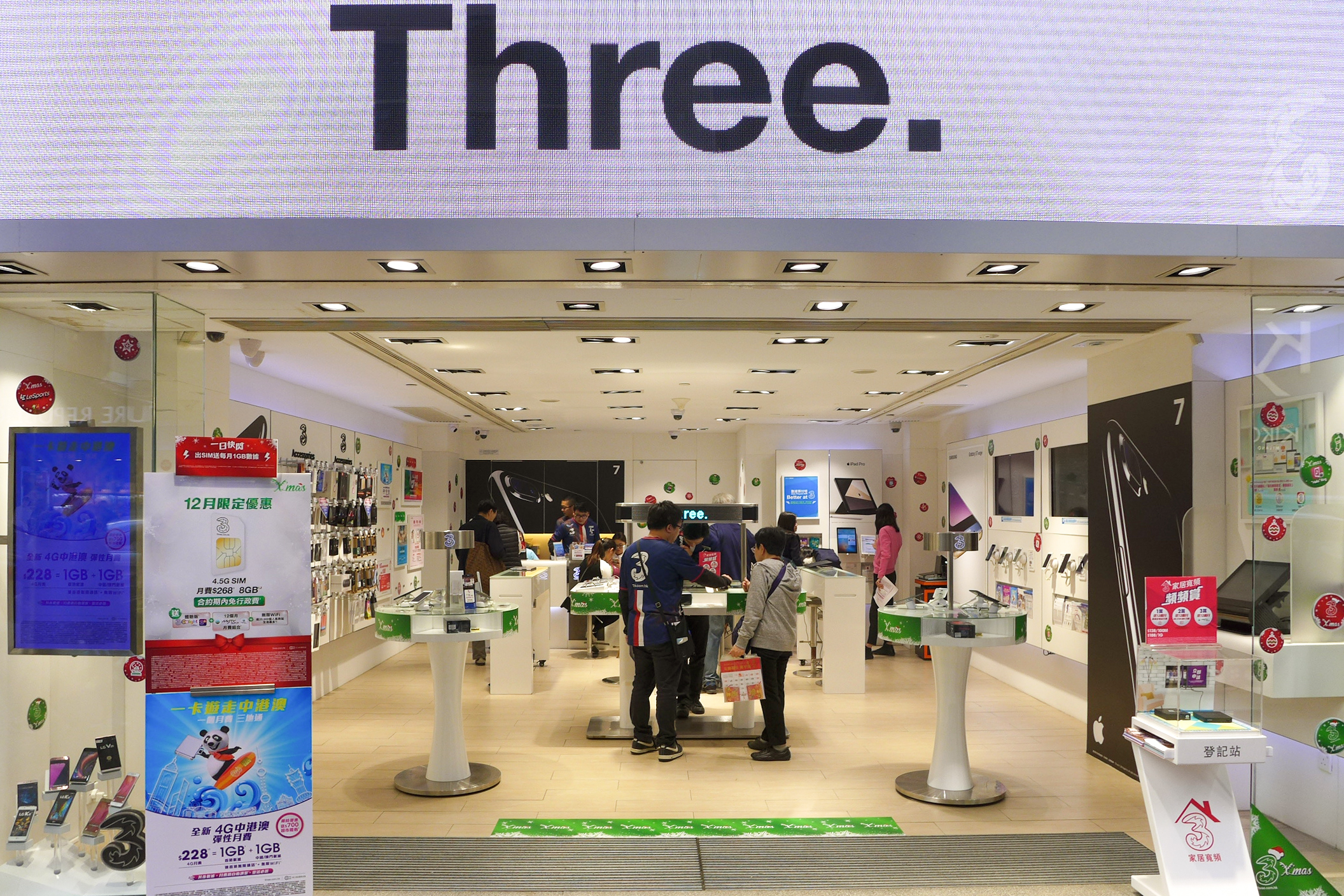
The 3Shop in Mong Kok

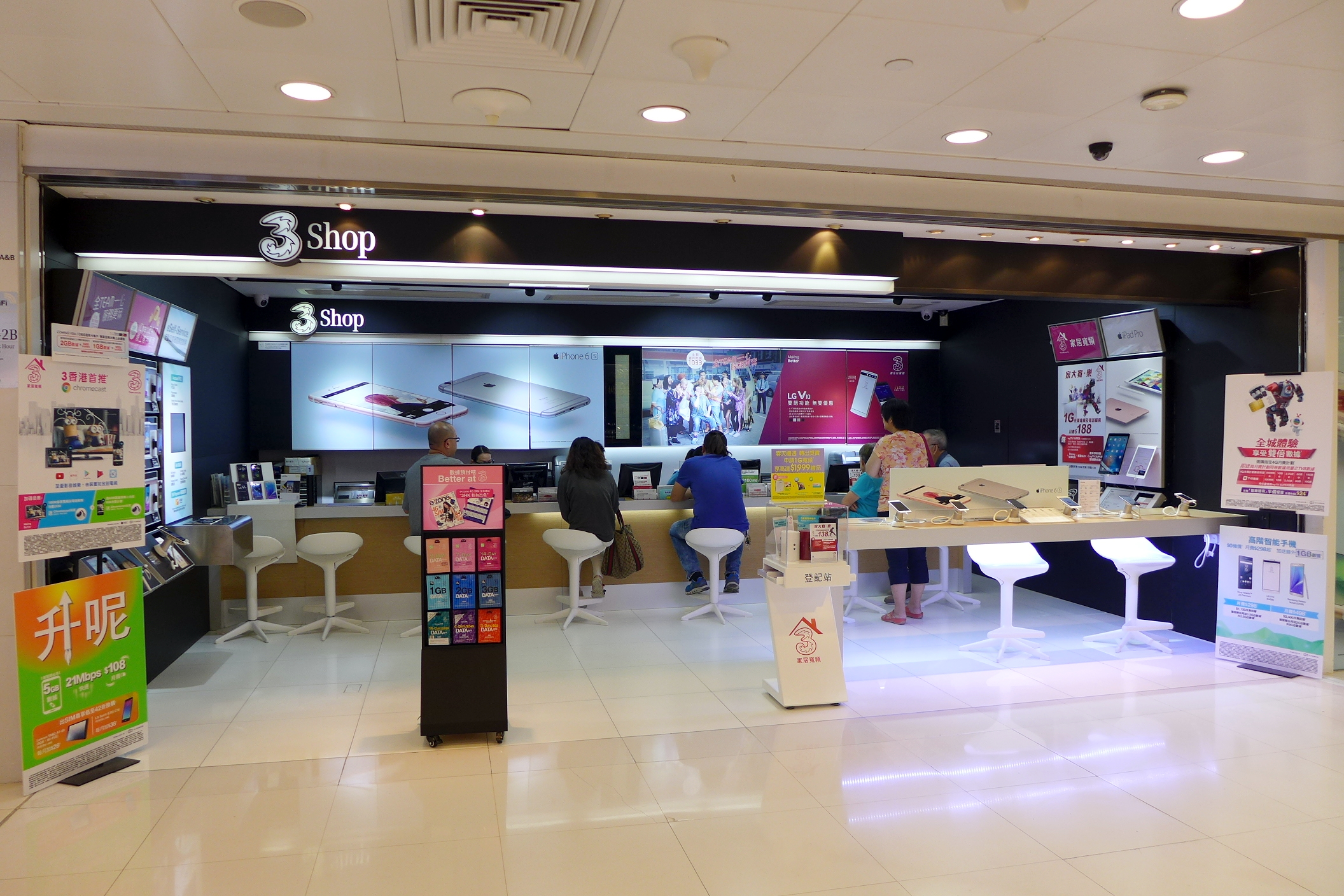
The 3Shop in Shatin Plaza

== History ==
The company started in 1984 as Hutchison Telecom Hong Kong, a telecommunications company that is granted licence to operate Advanced Mobile Phone Service (AMPS) cellular radio telephone network in Hong Kong. Afterwards, 3 launched Hong Kong's first analogue mobile telecommunications services in 1985.

In 1995, 3 launched their GSM service. In 1998, 3 pushed their first dual-band network in Hong Kong, which is Asia's first dual-band network.

In May 2004, its affiliated 2G operator Orange re-branded its services and changed its name to "3 Dualband", referring to the GSM product, and "3 CDMA", referring to the CDMA product.

On 29 May 2008, Hutchison Telecommunications (Hong Kong) Limited announced that it has signed an agreement with Apple Inc. to bring the iPhone to Hong Kong and Macau later that year under 3.

In 2010, 3 launched their 3Home Broadband (formerly 3ree Broadband) brand, integrating their fixed-line, mobile and Wi-Fi services together.

In 2012, 3 introduced 4G LTE service to Hong Kong. Later on, they announced full coverage in the MTR, the transit railway system in Hong Kong. In the same year, a partnership with Vodafone was launched. 3HK also became a member of the Conexus Mobile Alliance.

In 2014, they announced their plans to offer Skype's Unlimited World and also VoLTE services.

In 2016, 3 launched their 4.5G services.

As of August 2025, 3 is only mobile network operator in Hong Kong covers 5G network in every roads and tunnels in Hong Kong.

== Services ==
=== Mobile network ===
Frequencies used on 3 in Hong Kong
Frequency	Frequency Width	Protocol	Notes
700 MHz (703~713; 758~768)	2*10 MHz		
900 MHz (885~895; 930~940)	2*10 MHz	GSM/LTE	4G: 944.90;899.90
1800 MHz (1760~1770;1855~1865)+(1780~1785;1875~1880)	2*15 MHz ( not contiguous)	GSM/LTE	
2100 MHz (1964.9~1979.7;2154.9~2169.7)	2*15 MHz	HSPA+/LTE	2x10 MHz LTE
2300 MHz (2360~2390)	30 MHz	TD-LTE	20+10 Carrier Aggregation
2600 MHz (2500-2515, 2620-2635)	2x15 MHz	LTE	
2600 MHz (2515~2520;2635~2640)	2*5 MHz	LTE	via Genius Brand Limited (JV of HKT, three hk)
3.3 GHz (3300~3330)	30 MHz		
3.5 GHz (3560~3600)	40 MHz	5G NR	

Up till June 2017, 3 Hong Kong has 3.078 million subscribers, making them the third largest mobile network operator in Hong Kong. As to February 2018, 3 Hong Kong provided the following network service:

- GSM-900/1800 (GPRS, EDGE)
- 900/2100 MHz UMTS, HSPA, HSPA+, DC-HSPA+
- 900/1800/2100/2600 MHz LTE, 2300 MHz TD-LTE
- LTE Advanced
- LTE Advanced Pro

In 2017, it is reported that 3 is working with Huawei to provide 5G services in Hong Kong.

=== Home broadband ===
3 Hong Kong was originally providing home broadband services as 3Home Broadband. In 2017, 3Home Broadband was rebranded, separating with 3 and abandoning the Three brand. The service has since become one of the key services of HGC Global Communications, another subsidiary of CK Hutchison. Despite the rebrand, 3 Hong Kong stores (dubbed as 3Shop) still provide customer services and promotions for HGC home broadband services.

== See also ==
- Three UK / 3UK
- Three Ireland / 3Ireland
- Three Austria / 3Austria
- Three Sweden / 3Sweden
- Three Denmark / 3Denmark
- Three Macau / 3Macau
- Three Indonesia / 3Indonesia
- W3 / WINDTRE
- CMHK
- SmarTone
- CSL Mobile Limited
