= INQ Mini 3G =

Smartphone model

- Manufacturer: INQ
- Availability by region: Q4 2009
- Predecessor: INQ1
- Successor: Incumbent
- Related: INQ, INQ1, INQ Chat 3G
- Compatible networks: GPRS, EDGE, HSPDA
- Form factor: Candybar
- Dimensions: 102.9×45.8×12.8 mm (4.05×1.80×0.50 in)
- Weight: 90 g (3 oz) (128g with battery)
- Operating system: BREW 4.0 (Multi Tasking) + INQ System 1 extensions
- Memory: 128MB NAND + 128MB SDRAM
- Removable storage: microSD/microSDHC, tested up to 8 GB
- Battery: 1150mAh Li-ion 3.7V(4.3Wh)
- Rear camera: 2.0 megapixels
- Display: 2.2 inch, QVGA (240×320 pixels) 262k TFT LCD
- Connectivity: Bluetooth 2.0 + EDR (Headset, Handsfree, File Transfer, ObjectPush, A2DP, AVRCP, DUN), mini-USB v2.0
- Data inputs: Numeric keypad

The INQ Mini 3G is a 3G enabled "Candy Bar" smartphone created by "social phone developer" INQ. The INQ Mini 3G features Twitter, Facebook, Skype and Windows Live Messenger applications embed deep into the phone's Operating System. The phone has a numeric keypad, a 2-megapixel camera and a 2.2" screen. The phone is the second handset from INQ and succeeds the "Best mobile handset award 2009" winner INQ1.

== History ==
The BREW 4.0 device was announced on 4 August 2009. The phone soon got available in many countries with Hutchison 3G networks: Australia, Hong Kong, India, Ireland, Austria, Singapore, Sweden, United Kingdom

== Appearance ==
The phone's standard colors are black and red. Its rounded edges and the shiny surface make it look pretty smart. It features a numeric T9 keypad, a 2.2" QVGA TFT LCD screen, a mini-USB port, volume control buttons and INQ's famous Switcher button (Switcher = a gadget which allows you to switch between your running applications). The INQ Mini 3G's battery covers are changeable with 5 other colours: yellow, black, pink, green and blue. The default is a shiny red battery cover. The other colors can be purchased via local INQ stores or the provider.

== Features ==
=== Software ===
==== General ====
The phones operating system is BREW 4.0 (Multi Tasking) with INQ System 1 extensions. It features Java MIDP2.0 (Multi Tasking), Access Net Front 3.5 browser and INQ UI including Switcher (a gadget which allows you to switch between your running applications)

==== Widgets ====
The user of the phone can display widgets on their home screen for quick and easy access to information. Widgets include World Clock, Weather, Search, Feeds.

==== Applications ====
Built in applications include:

- Facebook
- Twitter
- Skype & Windows Live Messenger, which both make use of the free Skype and Messenger on selected Three networks (Skype is not available in Singapore)
- E-mail, including free Push GMail, as well as supporting the IMAP4, POP3 and SMTP e-mail protocols.
- A media player, capable of playing Audio: AMR, AAC, AAC+, MIDI, MP3, WAV; Video: MPEG4, H.263, H.264
- Access Net Front 3.5 browser

==== Social Networking ====
The Mini 3G is built for social-networking as all INQ phones are. INQ integrated its social tools deep in the phone:

- In the Contacts list, the user can assign social-networking profiles to a contact, including information about Facebook, Skype, Windows Live Messenger and e-mail. The contacts list then displays the Facebook or Windows Live Messenger profile picture, including the latest 'status update' from Facebook if the user is logged into the Facebook client. It also displays a small icon showing whether they are logged into Skype or Windows Live Messenger.

== Carrier ==
INQ is owned by Hutchison Whampoa, owner of Hutchison 3G; The INQ Mini 3G is currently carried on the following networks:

- 3 Australia
- 3 Hong Kong
- (India) Aircel
- (Republic of Ireland) 3 Ireland
- 3 Sweden
- (United Kingdom) 3 UK
- (Singapore) SingTel
- 3 Austria
