= 3 Skypephone S2 =

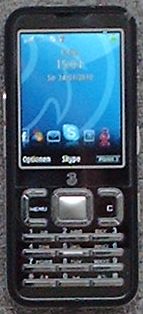
- Availability by region: August 2008
- Predecessor: 3 Skypephone
- Compatible networks: UMTS 2100, GSM 900, GSM 1800, PCS1900, GSM 1900, HSDPA, 3G
- Dimensions: 100 mm × 44 mm × 13.6 mm (3.94 in × 1.73 in × 0.54 in)
- Weight: 95 g (3.4 oz)
- Operating system: Qualcomm's BREW
- Memory: 50MB internal Expandable to 4 GB microSD
- Rear camera: 3.2 Megapixels
- Display: 2.2in QVGA
- Connectivity: Bluetooth 2.0 + EDR, USB (with Mass Storage Mode and Modem dongle support)

The 3 Skypephone S2 is a UMTS, GSM and VoIP mobile phone. The phone is the successor to 3 Skypephone and the second phone from the 3 Skypephone Series.

== iSkoot ==
The 3 Skypephone S2 runs on the iSkoot for Skype platform to provide its Skype service. iSkoot's shutdown of this service on 20 January 2011 caused this phone to show a non-functioning "click to upgrade" link, although some other phones were not affected. No warning was given by Three for this shutdown, and visiting the Three website shows they removed the Skypephone from their product offerings. This violates Three's own terms and conditions and the "Free Skype forever" promise leaving customers very angry and unable to use the arguably main functionality of this phone.

== In the box ==
- Handset
- Battery 1150 mAh. (AH-02)
- Battery cover.
- Personal stereo hands free kit (via mini-USB connector).
- USB cable.
- Mains charger (USB connector).
- 3 user guide.
- Quick start guide for Skype.
- Additional guides

== Specifications ==
The specifications released are as follow:

- Dimensions: 102.7 x 45 x 14mm
- Weight: 95g
- Display: 2.2in QVGA
- Battery: 1150mAh
- CPU: ARM variant as runs BREW operating system (see ARM architecture)
- Memory: 50 Mb onboard
- External memory: Micro SD up to 4 Gb
- Camera: 3.2Mpx camera
- HSDPA support: Up to 2.6 Mbit/s
- Additional features:
  - HSDPA modem dongle
  - Facebook application
  - Many native Brew applications.
  - RSS reader
  - Stereo handsfree and USB cable included

The battery life is as follows:

- Standby 320 hours
- Talk Time 270 minutes
- Video Talk Time 170 minutes

== Supported functionality ==
- Bluetooth stack with OBEX file transfer and A2DP support
- Streaming video (can receive TV channels, watch movies or YouTube over the 3G network)
- Streaming audio
- Free Skype-to-skype calls
- E-mail
- T9 dictionary
- 3.2Mpx camera
- Video recording
- Audio recording
- MP3 player (can also play WMA and AAC files)
- Memory: 50 Mb onboard
- External memory: Micro SD up to 4 Gb
- PC Suite synchronization (With Vista support)
- HSDPA support: Up to 2.6 Mbit/s
- HSDPA modem dongle
- Podcasting with Mobilcast (unofficially supported)
- Supports Java ME applications such as Opera Mini and many Java ME games.
- Facebook always on application, change your status and easily access your profile, friends, inbox, pokes and more.
- Charging via standard mini USB cable. (Though its own charging unit (wall plug) and USB to mini USB cable are included, any standard mini USB cable can be used to charge the skypephone in various locations or when traveling.)
- Brew games

== Not supported functionality ==
- Only Western Eu Latin Alphabets are supported, Cyrillic as used in Russian/Bulgarian and probably many other languages is not supported with all skype, web browser and text messages (SMS).

== 3 Skypephone S2x ==
The 3 Skypephone S2x is an upgrade of the 3 Skypephone S2. It is a slightly different shape and design and has a slightly poorer camera.

== See also ==
- 3 Skypephone Series
- 3 Skypephone S1
- Skype
- Hutchison 3G (3)
- BREW
