= INQ Cloud Touch =

- Manufacturer: INQ
- Series: INQ Cloud
- Availability by region: 6 April 2011
- Predecessor: INQ Mini 3G, INQ Chat 3G
- Related: Facebook
- Compatible networks: Triband HSPA, Quadband GSM, EDGE
- Form factor: Bar
- Weight: 122 g (4 oz)
- Operating system: Android 2.2 "Froyo"
- CPU: Qualcomm 7227 chipset, 600MHz
- Memory: 512 MB
- Storage: 4 MB (internal) 4 GB (Micro SD packaged with phone)
- Removable storage: microSD
- Battery: 1300mAh
- Rear camera: 5 megapixel autofocus
- Display: 3.5" HVGA capacitive touchscreen and 1 cm touch strip
- Media: Spotify as the default MP3 player
- Connectivity: WiFi (802.11b/g/n), Bluetooth, GPS, FM radio
- Data inputs: Capacitive touchscreen

The INQ Cloud Touch is the first Android mobile phone from London-based mobile phone manufacturer INQ. The phone features a Facebook application as the main aspect of the phone, with multiple entry points from the home screen.

== History ==
The phone was revealed by a press release on INQ's website on 10 February 2011. It then received further media attention at the Mobile World Congress in Barcelona a week later. The phone will be released on 6 April 2011 in the UK, and will be sold in The Carphone Warehouse and Best Buy stores. It will retail for £199.95 on pay as you go and £20/month on contract.

== Features ==
=== Facebook ===
Continuing with INQ's ethos of social media integration, the phone includes many features of Facebook such as Places and Chat. After INQ's former CEO Frank Meehan announced that they were "working closely with Facebook", rumours were rife that INQ were going to be producing the Facebook phone, officially branded and endorsed by Facebook.
