= Hutchison Telecommunications Hong Kong Holdings =

Hong Kong telecommunications company

Hutchison Telecommunications Hong Kong Holdings Limited
- Company type: Public
- Traded as: SEHK: 215
- Industry: Telecommunications
- Founded: 3 August 2007; 18 years ago
- Headquarters: Hong Kong
- Area served: Hong Kong; Macau
- Key people: Canning Fok (Chairman)
- Products: Mobile telephony; fixed telephony
- Parent: CK Hutchison Holdings
- Website: www.hthkh.com

Hutchison Telecommunications Hong Kong Holdings Limited (Chinese: 和記電訊香港控股有限公司) is a telecommunications operator in Hong Kong. It operates GSM dual-band, 3G, 4G LTE and 5G mobile services in Hong Kong and Macau under the licensed global Three brand.

It was listed on the Stock Exchange of Hong Kong on 8 May 2009 by way of introduction from the spin-off of Hutchison Telecommunications International. It is now a subsidiary of CK Hutchison Holdings.

In October 2017, Hutchison Telecommunications Hong Kong Holdings Limited disposed of its fixed-line subsidiary Hutchison Global Communications (HGC) to Asia Cube Global Communications Limited for HK$14.5 billion (US$1.86 billion) to focus on mobile business.

== Business ==
- 3 Hong Kong
- 3 Macau
