= INQ1 =

2008 mobile phone

- Availability by region: December 2008
- Compatible networks: UMTS 2100, GSM 900, GSM 1800, GSM 1900, HSDPA, 3G
- Operating system: Qualcomm's BREW (proprietary Linux-OS)
- Memory: 50MB internal Expandable to 8 GB microSD
- Rear camera: 3.2 Megapixels
- Display: 2.2in QVGA
- Connectivity: Bluetooth 2.0 + EDR, USB (with Mass Storage Mode and Modem dongle support)

The INQ1 is the first product of the Hutchinson Whampoa subsidiary, INQ. The INQ1 was released in December 2008 as a social-networking phone. Retailing at a cheaper price than competitors such as the iPhone, Blackberry Storm, G1 and Nokia 5800, it also contains slightly fewer features than other 3G 'smartphones'. It is thus marketed as an entry-level phone for users wanting to access websites and web-base applications from their mobile. The phone was created for the 3 phone network.

The INQ1 integrates a range of services such as Skype, Last.fm, eBay, Facebook, Myspace and Windows Live Messenger. The inclusion of Facebook in a prominent position has led to its description as 'the Facebook phone'.

== Reaction ==
The phone received generally positive reviews upon release. Some were extremely positive, with its low price, easy integration of multiple social networking features and light weight all being quoted as positive features. In particular, the phone was seen as successful for a manufacturer's first handset.

The phone was awarded 'best handset' at the 'Mobile World Congress' in February 2009

== Features ==
=== In the box ===
- Handset
- Battery
- Battery cover.
- Personal stereo hands free kit (via mini-USB connector).
- USB cable.
- Mains charger (USB connector).
- CD–ROM for PC connection.
- 3 user guide.
- Quick start guide for Skype.
- Additional guides

=== Supported functionality ===
- Bluetooth stack with OBEX file transfer and A2DP support
- Streaming video (can receive TV channels, watch movies or YouTube over the 3G network)
- Streaming audio
- Free Skype-to-skype calls
- E-mail
- T9 dictionary
- 3.2Mpx camera
- Video recording
- Audio recording
- MP3 player (can also play WMA and AAC files)
- Memory: 50 Mb onboard
- External memory: Micro SD up to 8 Gb
- PC Suite synchronization (With Vista support)
- HSDPA support: Up to 2.6 Mbit/s
- HSDPA modem dongle
- Podcasting with Mobilcast (unofficially supported)
- Supports Java ME applications such as Opera Mini and many Java ME games.
- Facebook always on application, change your status and easily access your profile, friends, inbox, pokes and more.
- Charging via standard mini USB cable. (though its own charging unit (wall plug) and USB to mini USB cable are included, any standard mini USB cable can be used to charge the phone)
- Brew games

== See also ==
- INQ
- 3 Skypephone Series
- 3 Skypephone S1
- Hutchison 3G (3)
