= CK Hutchison Holdings =

Hong Kong multinational conglomerate

CK Hutchison Holdings Limited

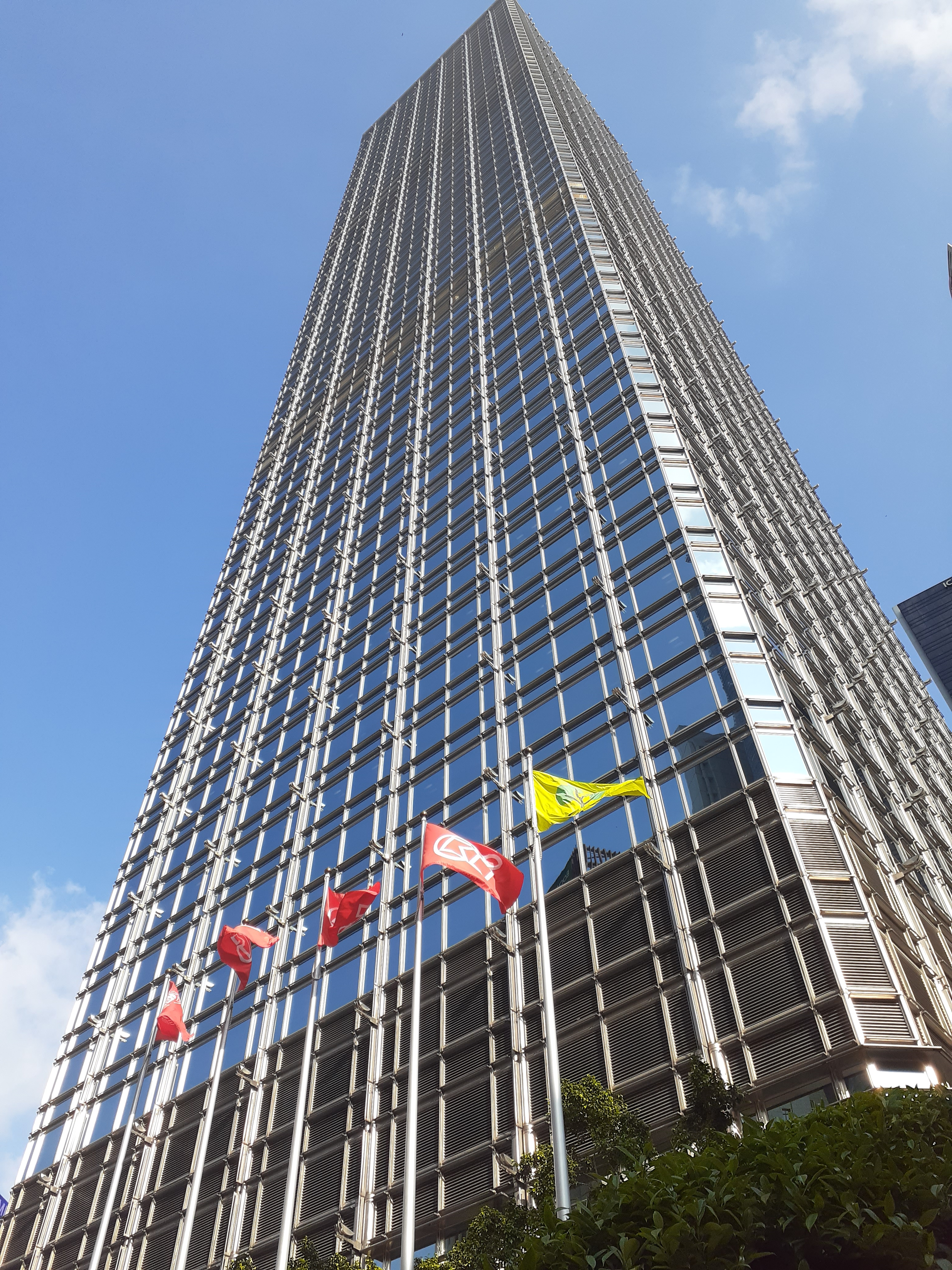
- Headquarters at the Cheung Kong Center
- Type: Private
- Traded as: SEHK: 1; S&P Asia 50 component; Hang Seng Index component
- Industry: Conglomerate
- Predecessors: Cheung Kong Holdings; Hutchison Whampoa
- Founded: As Cheung Kong Holdings in 1950; 76 years ago; As CK Hutchison Holdings on 18 March 2015; 11 years ago
- Headquarters: Cheung Kong Center, Hong Kong Island, Hong Kong
- Key people: Victor Li Tzar-kuoi (chairman and Group co-managing director); Canning Fok (Group co-managing director); Li Ka-shing (Senior advisor)
- Products: Core businesses – Ports and related services, Retail, Infrastructure and Telecommunications
- Revenue: ▲HK$280.8 billion (2021)
- Operating income: ▲HK$53.3 billion (2021)
- Net income: ▲HK$40.5 billion (2021)
- Total assets: ▼HK$1.21 trillion (2021)
- Total equity: ▲HK$644.3 billion (2021)
- Number of employees: 300,000+ (2021) (incl. subsidiaries)
- Subsidiaries: 3; Hutchison Asia Telecom Group; Hutchison Telecommunications Hong Kong Holdings; Hutchison Port Holdings; CK Infrastructure Holdings; AS Watson
- Website: www.ckh.com.hk

CK Hutchison Holdings Limited (Chinese: 長江和記實業有限公司) is a Hong Kong–based and Cayman Islands–registered multinational conglomerate corporation. The company was formed in March 2015 through the merger of Cheung Kong Holdings and its main associate company Hutchison Whampoa. It has four core businesses – ports and related services, retail, infrastructure and telecommunications – which operate in over 50 countries, as well as several other investments around the world.

== Holdings ==
The company owns substantial holdings in businesses across a number of industries.

=== Telecoms ===
The Group's telecommunications division is an operator of converged telecommunication and digital services around the world.

- CK Hutchison Group Telecom – operates 3-branded mobile telephone networks in Austria, Denmark, Ireland, Italy, Sweden.
  - 3 Danmark
  - Drei Austria
  - Three Ireland
  - Tre Sverige
  - Wind Tre (100% effective interest via CKH) – Italian operator of fixed and mobile telephony, born from the merger between 3 Italy and Wind.
- Hutchison Asia Telecom Group – operates mobile telephone networks in Indonesia, Sri Lanka and Vietnam.
  - Hutchison Telecommunications Lanka
  - Indosat Ooredoo Hutchison (65,6% via Ooredoo Hutchison Asia, where CKH co-owned its 50% stake with Ooredoo) – operates the 3 network in Indonesia alongside IM3.
  - Vietnamobile – co-owned with Hanoi Telecom.
- Hutchison Telecommunications Hong Kong Holdings – operates 3-branded mobile telephone networks in Hong Kong and Macau.
  - 3 Hong Kong
  - 3 Macau
- TPG Telecom (25.05% effective interest, formerly Vodafone Hutchison Australia) – the second-largest telecommunications company in Australia, owned via the 87.87% CKH-owned Hutchison Telecommunications (Australia) Limited.
- Metro Broadcast Corporation

=== Infrastructure ===
The company has investments in energy infrastructure, transportation infrastructure, water infrastructure, waste management, waste-to-energy and household infrastructure. Its investments and operations span across Hong Kong, Mainland China, the United Kingdom, Continental Europe, Australia, New Zealand, Canada and the United States.

- CK Infrastructure Holding (75.67%) – owns a number of infrastructure companies around the world.
  - Eversholt Rail Group
  - Australian Gas Networks
  - UK Power Networks
  - Northern Gas Networks
  - Northumbrian Water Group
  - Park 'N Fly Airport Parking
  - Wales & West Utilities
  - Power Assets Holdings (35.96%)
    - Hongkong Electric Company – Minority 33.37% holding is held through Power Assets Holdings.

=== Ports ===
As the world's leading port investor, developer and operator, the Group's ports division holds interests in 52 ports comprising 291 operational berths in 27 countries, including container terminals operating in six of the 10 busiest container ports in the world. In 2021, the division handled a total throughput of 88.0 million twenty-foot equivalent units ("TEU"). It also engages in river trade, cruise terminal operations and ports related logistic services.

- Hutchison Port Holdings
  - Westports Holdings (18.84% effective interest)
- Hutchison Port Holdings Trust (30.07%)

In March 2025, it is reported that CK Hutchinson Holding would sell Hutchinson Port Holdings and Hutchinson Port Group Holdings. There are reports stating that the key buyer is the Aponte Italian shipping family, and "the crucial figure" is Diego Aponte, group president of Mediterranean Shipping Company (MSC), and chairman of the Terminal Investment Limited (TiL). Gianluigi Aponte, MSC's founder, was reportedly personally playing a role in brokering the potential deal. TiL and BlackRock are consortium partners in the port deal. This comes in the context of U.S. President Donald Trump denouncing Chinese influence over the Panama Canal and calling for the United States to reclaim control of the canal in some form or another. In July 2025, Panama's government filed two lawsuits against CK Hutchinson's local subsidiary in the country's supreme court.

On 29 January 2026, Panama's supreme court nullifies the concession held by CK Hutchison to operate the Balboa and Cristóbal ports at the Panama Canal as unconstitutional and orders the facilities to be retendered, following a lawsuit by the comptroller after an audit alleged irregularities. These terminals at Balboa and Cristóbal have had their interim operations transferred to MSC and APM Terminals, a subsidiary of A.P. Møller – Mærsk, as of 11 March 2026. The Panamanian government subsequently accused CK Hutchinson of concealing information and obstructing a coordinated transition.

=== Retail ===
The Group's retail division is the world's largest international health and beauty retailer, with over 16,300 stores in 28 markets worldwide. Its retail portfolio comprises health and beauty products, supermarkets, as well as consumer electronics and electrical appliances. It also manufactures and distributes bottled water and beverage products in Hong Kong and Mainland China.

- AS Watson Group (75%) – health and beauty retail group, with subsidiaries around the world.
  - Watsons
  - ParknShop
  - Superdrug
  - The Perfume Shop
  - Savers Health & Beauty
  - Kruidvat
  - Rossmann, after buying 40% from Kruidvat
  - Trekpleister
  - PT Duta Intidaya (55.44% effective interest)

=== Other ===
- Cenovus Energy (15.71%) – Canadian energy company.
- Hutchison Water
- HUTCHMED (38.46%)
- CK Life Sciences (45.32%)
- TOM Group (36.11%)
- Marionnaud
- VietinBank (19,73%)
- AlipayHK (a joint venture with Alibaba's Ant Financial)

== Senior Directorship ==
=== Chairmen ===
1. Li Ka-shing (1950–2018)
2. Victor Li (Since 2018)

=== Deputy chairmen ===
1. George Magnus (1985–2005)
2. Victor Li (1994–2018)
3. Canning Fok (Since 2024)

=== Managing directors ===
1. Li Ka-shing (1950–1998)
2. Victor Li (1999–2015)
3. Victor Li and Canning Fok (2015– 2024)
4. Dominic Lai and Frank Sixt (Since 2024)

=== Senior advisors ===
1. Li Ka-shing (Since 2018)

== See also ==
- CK Asset Holdings
