= HGC Global Communications =

Internet service provider in Hong Kong

- Formerly: Callas; (1992–1993); Hutchison Global Communications; (1993–2000); Hutchison Global Crossing; (2000–2002); Hutchison Global Communications; (2002–2017)
- Type: Private
- Industry: Telecommunications
- Founded: 22 October 1992; 33 years ago in British Hong Kong
- Headquarters: Hong Kong
- Services: Internet service provider
- Website: www.hgc.com.hk

HGC Global Communications Limited, formerly known as Hutchison Global Communications Limited (abb. HGC), is an internet service provider of Hong Kong. In the past it was part of Hutchison Telecommunications (Hong Kong), itself part of a mega-conglomerate CK Hutchison Holdings. Hutchison Global Communications was a listed company, via its parent company Hutchison Global Communications Holdings from 2004 to 2005.

In July 2017, Hutchison sold HGC to a private equity fund Asia Cube Global.

== History ==
Hutchison Global Communications (HGC) was a major investor in the fibre-optic networks of Hong Kong. In 2003, the year of deregulation of the market of telecommunication of Hong Kong, HGC was one of the competitor of PCCW, the dominant operator at that time, which PCCW was majority owned by Richard Li, the younger son of the chairman of Hutchison Whampoa, Li Ka-shing. HGC became a joint venture of Hutchison Whampoa and Global Crossing from 2000 to 2002.

In 2004, a Bermuda incorporated, Hong Kong listed company, Vanda Systems & Communications Holdings acquired HGC as part of a backdoor listing. The Bermuda company was renamed into Hutchison Global Communications Holdings (former ticker symbol SEHK:757). However, it was privatized by Hutchison Telecommunications International (a listed company of Cheung Kong–Hutchison group) in 2005. A scandal was also exposed in the same year, which Vanda Systems & Communications Holdings, already an associate company of the mega-conglomerate Cheung Kong Holdings–Hutchison Whampoa in 2000, was involved in insider trading.

In 2009 another listed company Hutchison Telecommunications Hong Kong Holdings was formed by the spin-off of some assets of Hutchison Telecommunications International, floating Hutchison Global Communications and Macau sister companies as a separate listed company.

After the ultimate listed parent companies of the group, Cheung Kong and Hutchison merged to form CK Hutchison Holdings and CK Asset Holdings in 2015, HGC was sold to independent third parties Asia Cube Global in July 2017. The parent company of Asia Cube Global was a private equity fund. In turn the fund was managed by I Squared Capital. Financial Times described the disinvestment was "come after several similar divestments by tycoon families in Hong Kong." It was previously rumoured to sell to the same buyer of WTT HK in June 2017.
