= 3 Skypephone Series =

3 Skypephone
- Type: Brand name Joint venture
- Industry: Communications
- Founded: 2007
- Headquarters: London, United Kingdom
- Products: Mobile phones
- Parent: 3, Skype

The 3 Skypephone series was a range of 3G mobile phones made as a global project by the Three brand network. The project was initiated by Three's global handset team, some of whom later went on to found the mobile phone company INQ. The phones were sold in Australia, Austria, Denmark, Italy, Ireland, Sweden, the United Kingdom, Hong Kong and Macau, but the service has now been discontinued. Three offered 4000 free Skype outbound voice minutes with the phones. Initially, the quota expired after 90 days (30 days in Ireland) unless the user purchased another topup or was on a pay monthly plan. This restriction was lifted by the network in 2009, where calls could still be made and received without the need to "top up" with credit. The service was advertised as "unlimited" in the UK; however, it was subject to fair use limitations, as in other countries.

The Skypephone series of phones supported UMTS/W-CDMA 2100 MHz, GSM and GPRS (900/1800 MHz), as well as HSDPA with the Skypephone S2.

The Skypephone series used the normal 3G or GSM voice network for handling Skype calls, which permitted users to make Skype calls within Three's 3Gnetwork or when the user is out of range of the 3G network and is roaming on one of Three's partner 2G networks. The two Skypephone models were not unique in using normal GSM or 3G voice protocols for handling Skype]: Three's Symbian and Java ME-based Skype clients also did this, but they also needed a data connection for low-bandwidth communication with Three's servers while the voice call was being set up. All other mobile Skype applications (such as Skype for iPhone) used a GPRS, EDGE or 3G packet data connection to handle Skype.

The Skype application used was native to the 3 Skypephone series and is a Brew application, whereas other mobile Skype clients are 3rd-party downloads and are either Symbian or Java ME based (the latter is now defunct). An advantage of using the standardized 3GPP circuit-switched (CS) voice protocols for handling calls is that it does not require a constant GPRS, EDGE, 3G or WiFi data connection, all of which consume significantly more battery life than CS voice.

The 3 Skypephone series used a USB connector for recharging and phone-to-PC communication – allowing them to recharge when plugged into a computer. Phone-to-PC connections are also possible over Bluetooth.

== Devices ==
- 3 Skypephone S1
- 3 Skypephone S2

== Usage terms ==
Free Skype-to-Skype calls and instant messages were only available in the country where the phone was purchased, or while roaming on Three's sister networks. Skype-to-Skype calls and instant messages were subject to a fair use policy of 4,000 minutes of outgoing calls and 10,000 instant messages per month (depending on country).

For Three's pay as you go customers, the Skype functionality was subject to activating a minimum top-up (value depending on country) and valid for 90 days (30 days in Ireland) from activating their last top-up, but Three removed the minimum top-up requirement on 1 May 2009.

== INQ ==
The Skypephone project was a collaborative effort, with Three's global handset team working closely with Skype and Qualcomm. According to Skype, the Skypephone series, if it were to continue, could possibly be continued on a different network from Three.

In the Irish market, the phones were discontinued after the introduction of INQ handsets in January 2009.

== See also ==
- Three
- Skype
