= 3 Skypephone =

Mobile phone model

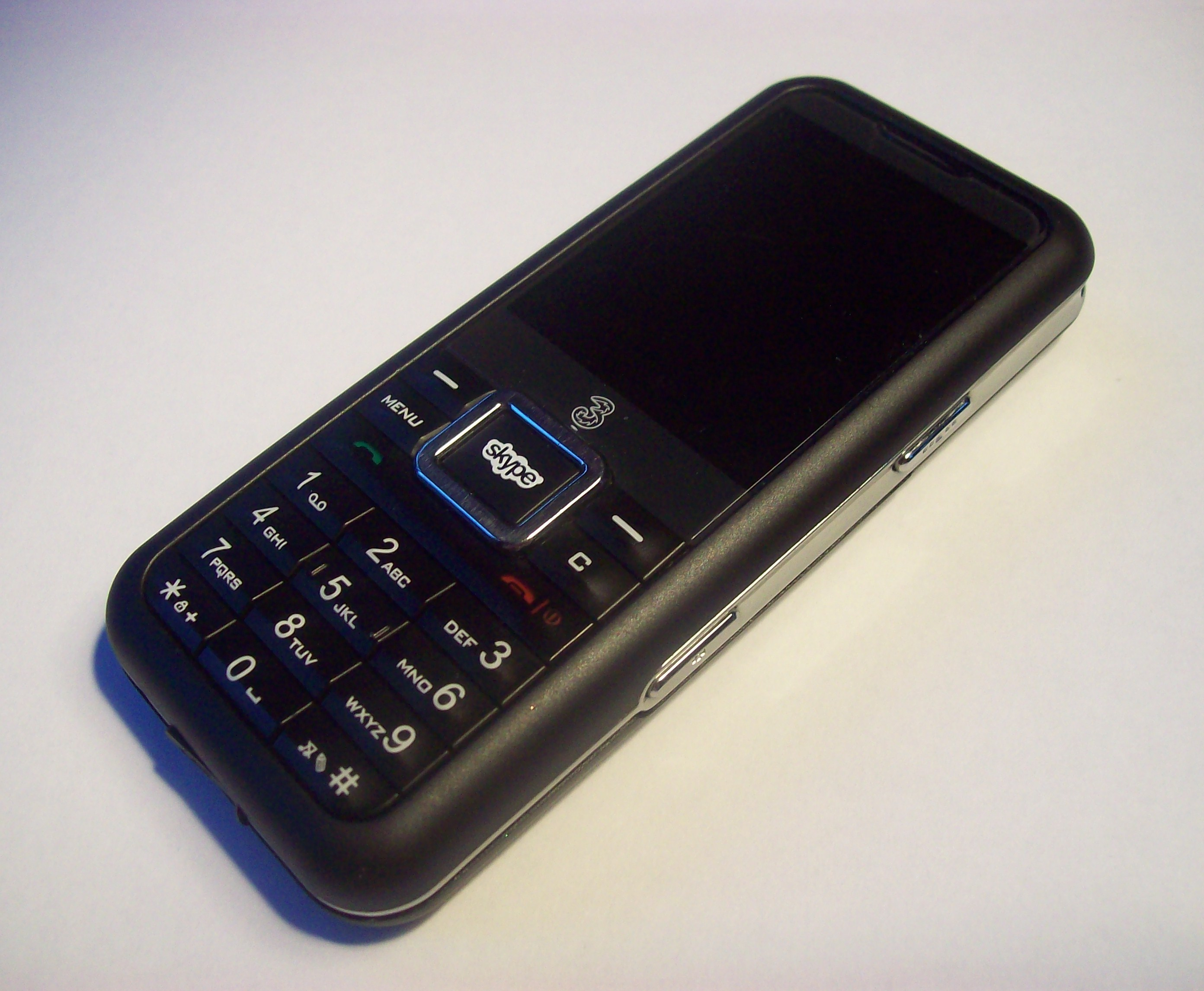
- The black version of the 3 Skypephone.
- Availability by region: Q4 2007
- Successor: 3 Skypephone S2
- Compatible networks: UMTS 2100, GSM 900, GSM 1800, GSM 1900
- Dimensions: 100 mm × 44 mm × 13.6 mm (3.94 in × 1.73 in × 0.54 in)
- Weight: 86 g (3.0 oz)
- Operating system: Qualcomm's BREW
- Memory: 16 MB internal Expandable to 1 GB (2 GB unofficially supported) microSD
- Rear camera: 2 Megapixels
- Display: 2.2 in (56 mm) 176×220 pixel display
- Connectivity: Bluetooth 2.0 + EDR, USB (with Mass Storage Mode support)

The 3 Skypephone (also known as the 3 Skypephone S1) is a UMTS, GSM and VoIP mobile phone. The phone is a joint product by Hutchison 3G and Skype. The 3 Skypephone S1 was the first in the 3 Skypephone Series to launch . It was widely acknowledged for its difference from other mobile phones for introducing Skype as a native application and introducing Brew OS to a European audience.

My3's website previously identified the phone model as the "Amoi 8512", while the packaging the phone comes in, calls it the "WP-S1". However, the phone is currently being marketed under the name 3 Skypephone S1 and is currently (as of November 2008) available in 3's own stores (including 3Stores within Superdrug premises) and in retail, depending on country.

Windows Live Messenger was initially supported on the phone in selected countries only. However, in late November 2007 it was released as a Java application in the UK, and is available via the Launcher softkey on the phone. Usage of Messenger is free on 3's UK and Ireland networks.

The physical dimensions of the phone include a weight of 86 g and size of 100×44×13.6 mm.

The battery life is as follows:

- Standby: 320 hours
- Talk Time: 270 minutes
- Video Talk Time: 170 minutes

A screen size of 2 inches (51 mm), at a resolution of 176×220 pixels is included, and it incorporates a 2 megapixel camera.

== Supported functionality ==
- Media player that plays AAC, AMR, M4A, MP3, WAV, 3GP, MP4, WMV and WMA files

== Issues ==
Issues with the 3 Skypephone included:

- The Skypephone does not support SkypeIn yet (except Hong Kong).
  - SkypeIn not officially available other than Hong Kong, but workaround software is available to use on your PC to connect SkypeIn calls to your 3Skypephone.
- There was formerly no SkypeOut functionality, however this has been addressed in the UK with a software update available on the application shop and under a folder called "Skype". Only calls to phones abroad are allowed, but a workaround to allow Skypeout calls to phones in the UK is possible.
- Skype conferencing is supported, however the handset cannot host conference calls, only join existing ones.
- No front-facing camera for video calls
- The rubber coating on the battery cover of the Black model is known to blister and peel when warm.

== See also ==
- 3 Skypephone Series
- 3 Skypephone S2
- Skype
- Hutchison 3G (3)
- BREW
