= Canning Fok =

Hong Kong business executive

- Education: Chartered accountant, with a bachelor's degree from Saint John's University in the US Diploma in Financial Administration from the University of New England in Australia.
- Occupations: Group managing director, Hutchison Whampoa Chairs numerous Hutchison businesses, including Hutchison Telecom International and HongKong Electric Holdings

Canning Fok
- Traditional Chinese: 霍建寧
Transcriptions
Standard Mandarin
- Hanyu Pinyin: Huò Jiànníng
Yue: Cantonese
- Jyutping: fok3 gin3 ning4

Canning Fok Kin-ning (Chinese: 霍建寧; born 1951 in Hong Kong) is a Hong Kong business executive. He is a director or chair of numerous management board in companies of Cheung Kong Holdings and Hutchison Whampoa. He is hailed as the "King of Employees" since he has been one of the Hong Kong's top-five taxpayers in the past few years.

== Education ==
Fok holds a Bachelor of Arts degree from St. John's University in Minnesota, United States, and a Diploma in Financial Management from the University of New England in New South Wales, Australia. He is a member of the Australian Institute of Chartered Accountants.

== Career ==
Fok is considered Li Ka-shing's right-hand man, and has worked alongside the business magnate for over 40 years as his trusted lieutenant and dealmaker.

== Positions ==
Fok worked as the following positions of the following companies.

- Deputy Chairman of CK Hutchison Holdings
- Deputy Chairman of Cheung Kong Infrastructure
- Chairman of Hongkong Electric Holdings
- Chairman of Hutchison Harbour Ring
- Chairman of Hutchison Telecommunications International Limited
- Chairman of Orange plc
- Chairman of TPG Telecom Limited
- Chairman of Hongkong International Terminals Limited
- Chairman of Partner Communications
- Co-chairman of Husky Energy
- Deputy Chief Commissioner of Indosat Ooredoo Hutchison

== Philanthropy ==
Fok endowed the Canning and Eliza Fok House, a graduate residence at Murray Edwards College, Cambridge. He also endowed the Eliza and Canning Fok Endowed Fund for International Student Financial Aid at Columbia College, the undergraduate liberal arts college of Columbia University.
