= Vietnamobile =

Vietnamese mobile network operator

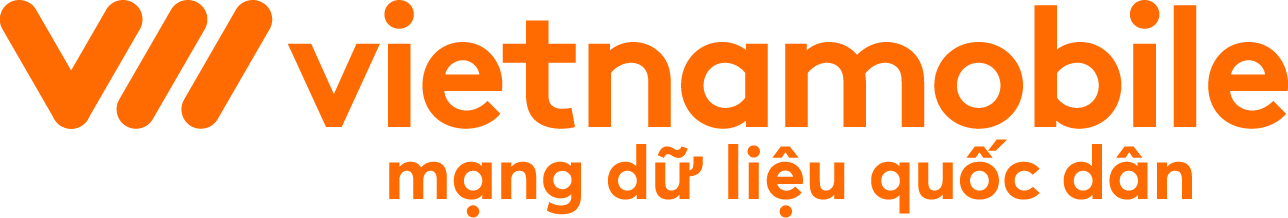
- Company type: Private
- Industry: Telecommunications
- Predecessor: HT Mobile
- Founded: April 2009; 17 years ago
- Area served: Vietnam
- Services: Mobile telephone company
- Owners: Hanoi Telecom; Hutchison Asia Telecom
- Website: vietnamobile.com.vn

Vietnamobile is a Vietnamese mobile network operator. It is under joint ownership of Hanoi Telecom and Hutchison Asia Telecom and the fourth largest provider as of 2023.

== History ==
HT Mobile was set up in 2007 as a joint-venture of Hanoi Telecom and Hutchison Asia Telecom. It was renamed to Vietnamobile in 2009, accompanied by the adoption of GSM technology to replace the less popular CDMA.

It started offering 3G services in late 2011, long after its major competitors.

== Market share and competitors ==
Vietnamobile had a market share (estimated based on revenues) of 1.75% in 2023. Its main competitors are Viettel with a market share of 57.6%, MobiFone with 22.52%, VNPT with 17.49%, the three large state-owned providers with a market share of almost 98%.
