= Network convergence =

Network convergence refers to the provision of telephone, video and data communication services within a single network. In other words, one company provides services for all forms of communication. Network convergence is primarily driven by development of technology and demand. Users are able to access a wider range of services, choose among more service providers. On the other hand, convergence allows service providers to adopt new business models, offer innovative services, and enter new markets.

== Introduction ==
One dictionary definition of "convergence" provides a starting point for the analysis: "the act of converging and esp. moving toward union or uniformity." The new regulatory framework that was shaped by the 1996 act eliminated the entry barrier for companies to expand their business into new markets. Local exchange carriers are allowed to start a business in the long-distance market and even video and broadband market. On the other hand, because cable TV and video services are regulated as "information services", cable companies are allowed entering the telecommunication market without applying for a license and exempted from heavy regulation. Two-way communication has been limited to voice and text by the limited availability of bandwidth; broadcast media have been restricted by their one-way character and by the availability of spectrum. Nowadays technology development, fierce competition, and deregulation have transformed several distinct communications service markets into a converged market. In the telecommunications world, convergence has come to mean a moving towards the use of one medium as opposed to manipulation of all forms of information including voice, data, and video across all types of network instead of carrying information separately within distinct networks. In the convergent network, different forms of information can be re-engineered to provide better, more flexible service to the user. For example, telephone networks can transmit data and video and cable networks are able to provide voice services. The reason media convergence occurs is due to both corporation and consumer developments. AT&T and Verizon are among the many service providers that are required to separate their IP and Transport networks into two different ones. They are made up and managed by different parts of each company, which causes an increase in its overall management and overuse of resources.

== Types ==
Convergence is about services and about new ways of doing business and interacting with society. The basic type of network convergence is the combination and connection across platforms and networks, which allows several types of networks to connect within certain common standards and protocols. The second type is the convergence of telecommunication service, which allows firms to use a single network to provide several communication services that traditionally required separate networks, which often is called the triple play or quadruple play in the USA. The third type is market convergence. The convergent network will stimulate mergers, acquisitions and collaborations among corporations. New business entities are created to offer multiple services, old and new, and address different markets. Digital technology allows both traditional and new communication services – whether voice, data, sound or pictures – to be provided over many different networks. Whether at home, at the office, or in the classroom, people enjoy the conveniences and entertainment brought by convergence like video-on-demand, interactive television, the Internet, personal digital assistants, and so on. Examples of products and services being delivered include:

- Home-banking and home-shopping over the Internet,
- Voice over Internet protocol (VoIP);
- E-mail, data and World Wide Web access over mobile phone networks, and the use of wireless links to homes and businesses to connect them to the fixed telecommunications networks;
- Data services over digital broadcasting platforms;
- On-line services combined with television via systems such as Web-TV, as well as delivery via digital satellites and cable modems;
- Webcasting of news, sports, concerts and of other audiovisual services

== United States ==
Network convergence in the US is facilitated by the legal and regulatory framework put into place by Congress and the Federal Communications Commission (FCC) and driven by new generations of telecommunication technology. Unlike other countries (e.g., Japan, South Korea, China) or regions (e.g., the European Union), the U.S. never adopted a formal convergence policy. Technological change is driving convergence from previously distinct telecommunications and media markets. The U.S. communications infrastructure is evolving from circuit-based networks, in which individual applications are tightly woven into the network architecture, to Internet Protocol network, in which multiple applications ride on top of the physical network layer.

=== Telecommunications Act of 1996 ===
The Telecommunications Act of 1996 is a fundamental document for network convergence in the US. Before that time, the industry was characterized by service-specific networks that did not compete with another: circuit-switched networks provided telephone service and coaxial cable networks provided cable service. The 1996 Act introduced full competition into all telecommunications markets by abolishing the remaining legal entry barriers into local telecommunications services.

The objective of the Act was to open up markets to competition and to create a regulatory framework for the transition from primarily monopoly provision to competitive provision of telecommunications services: The conference report refers to the bill "to provide for a pro-competitive, de-regulatory national policy framework designed to accelerate rapidly private sector deployment of advanced information technologies and services to all Americans by opening all telecommunications markets to competition...." Likewise, the Act created distinct regulatory regimes for these service-specific telephone networks and cable networks that included provisions intended to foster competition from new entrants that used network architectures and technologies similar to those of the incumbents. The deployment of digital technologies in these previously distinct networks has led to market convergence and "intermodal" competition, as telephone, cable, and even wireless networks increasingly are able to offer voice, data, and video services over a single broadband platform.

=== Regulation and deregulation ===
Timeline of government policy to accelerate network convergence:

Time	Government Regulation	Details
1996	Telecommunication Act of 1996	Allow telecom companies interconnection, Relaxed the restriction and regulation on the convergence among cable, broadband and telecom business.
1996	The act set up the plan for broadband development in US in the 21st Century	In the collaboration of other government administrative agencies (NTIA, USDA), FCC implemented a series of acts to enhance the regulatory framework and eliminate economic carriers in order to develop and deploy new technology.
2002	< Declaratory ruling >	FCC classified cable modem business as "information service" instead of "telecommunication service". As a result, cable company is not subjected to the regulation for telecommunication service carrier.
2003	FCC reduced the restrictions for local exchange carriers in "line sharing" and "network element non-bundling".	The policy stimulated service providers’ investment in upgrading network and market demand. Responding to the changing policy, service provides increased investment to enhance the network capacity and low down service price to attract consumers.
2005.8	The U.S. Supreme Court affirmed FCC's ruling that cable broadband service was classified as "information service"	As a result, cable service providers have no obligation to open their broadband access to competitors.
2009.2	President Obama initialed the economic plan. In the plan IT session was consist of extending broadband network, intelligent grid network, e-government and so on.	Broadband network was the fundamental part of the IT economic plan. The government expected to exempt tax of about 20 billions for corporations in the related market, as return for them to expand and develop broadband network.
2009.4	FCC announced to officially launch the National Broadband Plan which is a total investment of 7.2 billions.	The details of the plan will submit to the congress by 2010. The objective of the plan is to spread the high-speed Internet access to every corner of the US.

=== Telecommunication and information services ===
In the environment of convergent network, specific services with certain network technologies will receive different regulatory treatments. The 1996 Act created distinct regulatory categories for services that are provided by different network technologies. Besides the existing regulation framework for regulating telecommunications services and cable services in another title, the 1996 Act defines a category of services, "information services", that distinguished from "telecommunications services" and was not subject to either telephone or cable regulation. "Information services" are consisted of the offering of a capability for generating, acquiring, storing, transforming, processing, retrieving, utilizing, or making available information via telecommunications. For instance, voice and video services that are provided using Internet protocol technology may be classified as "information services" and therefore not subject to traditional voice or video regulation.

The distinction in the 1996 Act between telecommunications services and information services was an outgrowth of a series of FCC Orders and decisions dating back to the 1970s that distinguished between "basic" services that were subject to regulation and "enhanced" services that the Commission chose not to regulate in order to foster their development and deployment. The Act places on all telecommunications services providers the duty to interconnect "...directly or indirectly with the facilities and equipment of other telecommunications carriers..." Keeping with this regulatory history, the Commission has chosen to forbear from regulating information services, again seeking to foster their development and deployment.

The new regulatory framework that was shaped by the 1996 act eliminated the entry barrier for companies to expand their business into new markets. Local exchange carriers are allowed to start a business in the long-distance market and even video and broadband market. On the other hand, because cable TV and video services are regulated as "information services", cable companies are allowed entering the telecommunication market without applying for a license and exempted from heavy regulation. Furthermore, telephone companies must interconnect their loops and network with cable companies when they need infrastructure support for telecommunication services.

=== Market reform ===
The development of technology and government regulation turned the segmented telecom market into one converged market. Separate and static markets are becoming convergent and dynamic. Competition in the market has forced players to discover new markets and new business models. Deregulation, which has removed entry barriers, has allowed telecom carriers to enter the market and to create a new market for bundling services. These internal and external forces drive telecom operators to search for a breakthrough.

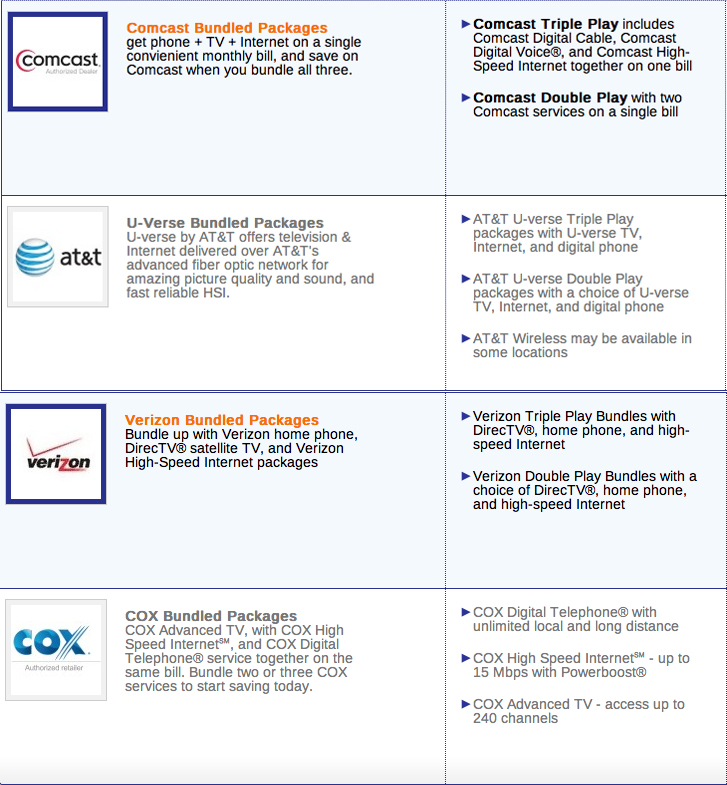
Bundled services provided by multiplay companies.

==== Bundled service ====
Traditional communication companies that now carry telephone services are moving closer to universal service. As a result, the new market improves the utilization of the existing infrastructure, making it more cost-efficient. Further, many non-traditional infrastructures, including cable television and electricity distribution networks, can now carry telephone service, moving countries closer to universal service and improving the utilization of existing infrastructure, allowing them to provide ICT services to communities that earlier had none. The ability of cable television infrastructure to carry converged services has driven investment in fiber optic networks by telecommunications operators. Such service provision brings with it the potential for significant social and economic transformation to otherwise underserved areas.

==== Infrastructure ====
As mentioned above, traditional telephone companies are taking different measures to expand businesses in the convergent market. On the aspect of infrastructure, companies like AT&T started upgrading from traditional copper wires to fiber to enhance the quality and speed in voice and data transmission. With a relatively simple upgrade, they can offer digital subscriber lines (DSL), which allow high-speed access to the Internet. Carriers are also acquiring cable infrastructure to complement their own copper ones and seeking cooperation with cable companies. These movements will help expand their business by adding programming and interactive television in the future. Verizon are investing more than $15 billion to upgrade network. Those investments are giving positive results: Verizon's recent financial reports show it has added 263,000 new television customers and 262,000 net new Internet customers on its new fiber network. Simultaneously, it has grown consumer revenues by about 1 per cent in legacy telecommunications markets with its video and broadband services driving growth. AT&T also launched its own bundled service, which consists of voice, video, broadband and cable service. By using specialized hardware and a web interface, users are allowed to control and select the programs and link to the Internet on TV.

==== Mergers and acquisitions ====
Another major result of network convergence included the approval of mergers and acquisitions. Mergers and acquisitions are a couple of ways to enter a new market and further propelled companies to enter into strategic alliances, joint ventures, and in some cases, mergers, which enables them to offer a menu of product options to customers and to operate their systems more efficiently. Digital convergence encourages mergers between companies in different areas and changes the service market. In 1998, FCC reviewed the applications of the MCI–WorldCom, SBC–SNET, AT&T–Teleport and AT&T–TCI mergers. FCC also took time to review petitions by SBC, which wanted to extend the time the Commission determined for it to comply with the conditions of its merger with Ameritech. Mergers reviewed in 2000 included Bell Atlantic–GTE, which became;jter approval; Qwest–US West; and MCI WorldCom–Sprint, which was withdrawn; Verizon–NorthPoint; and Verizon–One Point. Carriers are adding services to their traditional telephone business after upgrading their networks and engaging in multiple alliances and acquisitions of other companies. Additionally, companies that already offer a substantial number of these services have been able to charge comparatively lower fees to having these services provided by different companies.

== Quality of Service (QoS) ==
Quality of Service (QoS) mechanisms remain relevant in modern networking environments, particularly for managing latency-sensitive and mission-critical applications such as Voice over IP (VoIP), video conferencing, online gaming, and real-time cloud services. QoS provides traffic classification, prioritization, and bandwidth management to ensure consistent service performance in congested networks.

Historically, QoS configurations relied on manual, per-device settings that were often complex, error-prone, and limited in granularity. These challenges led many network operators to adopt alternative strategies such as physical network isolation and bandwidth overprovisioning to avoid congestion and ensure application performance.

However, modern developments have significantly enhanced QoS usability and deployment. Enterprise technologies like Software-Defined Networking (SDN) and SD-WAN support adaptive QoS, which dynamically adjusts policies based on real-time network conditions and application awareness. Additionally, many home routers now include user-friendly QoS settings, allowing consumers to prioritize bandwidth for specific devices or applications through graphical interfaces or mobile apps.

Open-source router firmware projects like OpenWrt and Tomato also support advanced QoS through tools like DSCP tagging, hierarchical queuing disciplines, and Active Queue Management (AQM) systems such as FQ-CoDel and CAKE.

These advancements reflect the continued importance of QoS in contemporary networks. While overprovisioning and physical isolation remain valid strategies in some contexts, scalable and intelligent QoS implementations have become increasingly common across enterprise, service provider, cloud, and consumer environments.

== See also ==
- Federal Communications Commission
- Communications Act of 1934
- Telecommunications Act of 1996
- Technological convergence
