= Indosat =

Indonesian telecommunications corporation

PT Indosat Tbk

- Headquarters of Indosat Ooredoo Hutchison in Jakarta (black tower in the center)
- Trade name: Indosat Ooredoo (2015–2022); Indosat Ooredoo Hutchison (since 2022)
- Formerly: PT Indonesian Satellite Corporation (1967–1984); PT Indosat (Persero) Tbk (1984–2003)
- Type: Public
- Traded as: IDX: ISAT; NYSE: IIT (1994–2013)
- Industry: Telecommunications
- Predecessors: Bimagraha Telekomindo (1992–2003); Satelindo (1993–2003); Indosat-M3 (2001–2003); Hutchison 3 Indonesia (2000–2022); MNC Kabel Mediacom (2013–2024)
- Founded: 20 November 1967; 59 years ago
- Founder: ITT Corporation
- Headquarters: Jl. Medan Merdeka Barat No. 21, Jakarta, Indonesia
- Key people: Vikram Sinha (CEO)
- Brands: IM3; 3 (Three); Indosat HiFi
- Services: Cellular, fixed line and MIDI (multimedia data internet)
- Revenue: ▼ Rp 26.117 trillion (2019)
- Net income: ▲ Rp 1.63 trillion (2019)
- Total assets: ▲ Rp 62.813 trillion (2019)
- Total equity: ▲ Rp 12.723 trillion (2019)
- Owners: Ooredoo Hutchison Asia (Ooredoo and Hutchison Asia Telecom Group/CK Hutchison Holdings) (65.6%); Government of Indonesia (9.6% + golden share)
- Website: ioh.co.id/portal/en/iohindex (Corporate); im3.id/portal/en/indexpersonal (IM3); tri.co.id (3 (Tri)); hifi.ioh.co.id (Indosat HiFi)

PT Indosat Tbk, trading as Indosat Ooredoo Hutchison, abbreviated as IOH, is an Indonesian telecommunications provider which is owned by Ooredoo Hutchison Asia, a joint venture between Ooredoo and Hutchison Asia Telecom Group (a part of CK Hutchison Holdings) since 2022. The company offers wireless services for mobile phones and, to a lesser extent, broadband internet lines for homes. Indosat operates its wireless services under two brands: IM3 and Three (3). These brands differ by their payment model (pre-paid vs. post-paid) as well as pricing. Indosat also provides other services such as IDD, fixed telecommunications, and multimedia.

In February 2013, Qtel, a majority stakeholder in Indosat, rebranded itself as Ooredoo. This was followed by a renaming of all their subsidiaries across multiple countries. As such, Indosat was renamed Indosat Ooredoo on 19 November 2015.

As of Q4 2018, Indosat had 58 million subscribers. This is a sharp decrease from 2017, when the number was reported as 110 million. The market share was 16.5%, making it the second largest mobile network operator in the country.

== History ==
=== 1967 ===
Indosat was established as the first foreign investment company in Indonesia that provides international telecommunication services using an international satellite. It was owned by American conglomerate company ITT (through its subsidiary American Cable and Radio Corporation) until 1980.

=== 1980 ===
Logo between 1984 and 2003

Indosat expanded into becoming the first international company that was acquired and 100% owned by the Indonesian Government.

=== 1994–2003 ===
Indosat acquired Satelindo and SLI through share majority. They also established PT Indosat Multimedia Mobile (IM3) to provide and operate a nationwide GPRS network, a first for the country. In 2003, Indosat merged with its 3 subsidiaries—Satelindo, IM3, and Bimagraha—and established itself as a mobile network operator.

=== 2003–2009 ===
Logo between 2003 and 2005

Logo between 2005 and 2015

Indosat was granted a 3G network license and introduced a 3.5G service in Jakarta and Surabaya. In 2009, Qtel bought 24.19% of series B shares from the public and became Indosat's majority shareholder with a 65% ownership. They were granted the use of additional 3G frequencies later that same year. Indosat also won the WiMAX bid from the government during this period.

=== 2012–2020 ===
Logo of Indosat Ooredoo, used from 18 November 2015 until 3 October 2019

In 2014, Indosat launched and commercialized a 4G service at 900 MHz, with a download speed of up to 42 Mbit/s. The service was first rolled out in the major cities, with planned expansions to rural areas. In November 2015, Indosat rebranded itself as Indosat Ooredoo. In 2016, Indosat teamed up with Swedish-based music streaming service Spotify to become the first operator to offer Spotify music services in Indonesia.

=== 2021–present ===
Logo of Indosat Ooredoo, used from 3 October 2019 until 4 January 2022

In January 2021, Indosat announced that it will exit the satellite business. In September 2021, Indosat has announced that the latter company would be merged with Hutchison Asia Telecom Group/Garibaldi Thohir's joint venture PT Hutchison 3 Indonesia (who operates 3-branded networks in Indonesia) to form Indosat Ooredoo Hutchison (IOH). The merger was closed on 4 January 2022.

== Subsidiaries ==
=== Current ===
- Lintasarta is an Indonesian company serving as a provider of data communication. The company is owned majority by Indosat Ooredoo; the remaining shares are owned by several institutions such as foundations and cooperatives. The company provides various terrestrial solution services (Wireline, Wireless) and VSAT with multiple platforms such as Clear Channel, Frame Relay, and IP. It also provides dedicated internet service and acts as a Data Center.

=== Former ===
- PT Indosat Mega Media (Indosat-M2) is wholly-owned by PT Indosat Tbk, a telecommunications service provider in Indonesia. Since 2000, Indosat-M2 has been focused on developing and implementing IP-based services, internet solutions, and multimedia products across the country.

== Slogans ==
=== As Indosat ===
- Indosat, Kami Lebih Peduli (Indosat, We Care More) (1994–2002)
- Indosat, Easier. Simpler. Better. (2002–2005)
- Sinyal Kuat Indosat (Indosat Strong Signal) (2004–2011) (Note: The slogan was stopped in 2008 and reused in 2009)
- Senyum Indosat (Indosat Smile, 2010, secondary)
- Indosat, The Future is Here (2005–2006)
- Punya Indosat (Owned by Indosat) (2006–2015)

=== As Indosat Ooredoo ===
- Indosat Ooredoo, Mari Sambut Perubahan (Indosat Ooredoo, Let's Welcome The Change) (2015–2022)

=== As Indosat Ooredoo Hutchison (IOH) ===
- Indosat Ooredoo Hutchison, Bersatu untuk Indonesia (Indosat Ooredoo Hutchison, United for Indonesia) (2022)
- Indosat, Empowering Indonesia (2022–present)

== Shareholders ==
Following are Indosat Ooredoo Hutchison shareholders (as of 4 January 2022):

- Ooredoo Hutchison Asia (65.6%), which is jointly owned by Ooredoo and Hutchison Asia Telecom Group
- The Government of Indonesia (9.6%)
- Public, including PT Tiga Telekomunikasi Indonesia, which is jointly owned by Garibaldi Thohir and Northstar Group (24.8%)

Frequencies used on Indosat Network in Indonesia
Band	Frequency	Frequency Width	Protocol	Notes
8	900 MHz	2*10 MHz	EDGE / LTE / LTE-A	
3	1800 MHz (1732.5~1742.5, 1827.5~1837.5) (1742.5~1762.5, 1837.5~1857.5)	2*10 MHz; 2*20 MHz	EDGE / LTE / LTE-A	
1	2100 MHz (1920~1935, 2110~2125) (1935~1945, 2125~2135)	2*15 MHz; 2*10 MHz	LTE / LTE-A / NR	
