= Hutchison Asia Telecom =

Hong Kong telecommunications company

Hutchison Asia Telecommunications Limited
- Trade name: Hutchison Asia Telecommunications Limited (since 11 October 2010; lowercase)
- Formerly: Glory Chance International Limited (21 January 2004–11 February 2004; capital letter; Hutchison Global Communications Holdings Limited (11 February 2004–14 April 2004; capital letter); Hutchison Telecommunications International (HK) Limited (14 April 2004–9 June 2010; capital letter); Hutchison Telecommunications International (HK) Limited (9 June 2010–11 October 2010; lowercase)
- Company type: Division
- Industry: Telecommunications
- Founded: 21 January 2004; 22 years ago
- Headquarters: Hong Kong
- Area served: Indonesia; Sri Lanka; Vietnam
- Key people: Canning Fok (Chairman)
- Products: Mobile telephony; fixed telephony
- Parent: CK Hutchison Holdings

Chinese name
- Traditional Chinese: 和記亞洲電訊集團
- Simplified Chinese: 和记亚洲电讯集团
- Jyutping: wo4 gei3 ngaa3 zau1 din6 seon3 zaap6 tyun4
- Cantonese Yale: wòh gei nga jāu dihn seun jaahp tyùhn
- Hanyu Pinyin: Héjì yàzhōu diànxùn jítuán
Transcriptions
Standard Mandarin
- Hanyu Pinyin: Héjì yàzhōu diànxùn jítuán
Yue: Cantonese
- Yale Romanization: wòh gei nga jāu dihn seun jaahp tyùhn
- Jyutping: wo4 gei3 ngaa3 zau1 din6 seon3 zaap6 tyun4

short name
- Traditional Chinese: 和電亞洲
Transcriptions

Hutchison Telecommunications International Limited
- Traditional Chinese: 和記電訊國際有限公司
Transcriptions

former short name
- Traditional Chinese: 和電國際
Transcriptions
- Website: www.ckh.com.hk/en/businesses/hat.php

Hutchison Asia Telecommunications Limited (Chinese: 和記亞洲電訊有限公司), (doing business as Hutchison Asia Telecom Group, often referred to as HAT), is a division of Hong Kong-based multinational conglomerate to CK Hutchison Holdings. The division provides telecommunications services to several Asian countries. The division was formerly incorporated as Hutchison Telecommunications International (HK) Limited, known as Hutchison Telecom or HTI in short. It was an offshore company in the Cayman Islands and a listed company in the Stock Exchange of Hong Kong. It operates GSM, 3G and 4G mobile telecommunications services in Indonesia, Sri Lanka and Vietnam under brands 3, Hutch and Vietnamobile.

Hutchison Telecommunications International was formerly a listed company with a primary listing on the Stock Exchange of Hong Kong (former stock code: 2332) and American depositary shares quoted on the New York Stock Exchange. In May 2010, Hutchison Telecom became a fully owned subsidiary of Hutchison Whampoa and its shares were delisted. In 2009, Hutchison Telecom also spun off part of their assets as a separate listed company Hutchison Telecommunications Hong Kong Holdings, which including 3 Hong Kong and Hutchison Global Communications.

== History ==
In 1999 and 2000, Hutchison Telecom sold its Orange and VoiceStream interests and re-invested the greater part of the proceeds to develop its global third-generation (3G) mobile broadband telecommunications business, based on the European UMTS (W-CDMA) 3G standard.

In early 2007, Hutchison Telecom made headlines by selling its 67% interest in the Indian mobile phone network Hutch Essar to Vodafone for US$13.1 billion (of which $2 billion was debt).

In December 2007, minority shareholder of Hutchison Telecommunications International (HTIL), Orascom Telecom, sold the 14.2% stake of HTIL, to HTIL's parent company Hutchison Whampoa, for HK$7.5 billion (approx. US$962 million). Orascom also reduced the stake from 19.3% to 16.3%, through a private placement of shares to the market in October 2007.

In 2009, Hutchison sold its controlling stake in Orange Israel to Scailex Corporation. Thus it ended using the Orange brand for providing mobile services.

In 2009, it spun off Hutchison Telecommunications Hong Kong Holdings (stock code: 215) to be listed on the Stock Exchange of Hong Kong.

In 2010, the company was privatized.

27.37 percent of Hutchison Asia Telecom is owned by the Swedish telecommunications company Tele2, which acquired Hutchison Asia Telecom in To be announced.

== Current operations ==
=== Indosat Ooredoo Hutchison ===
In July 2005, Hutchison Telecom acquired a 60% equity stake in PT Hutchison 3 Indonesia ("H3I", formerly known as PT Hutchison CP Telecommunications ("Hutchison CP Telecom" or "HCPT"), PT Cyber Access Communication and PT Telindo Inti Nusa) from the Charoen Pokphand Group Indonesia. In 2006, H3I announced that it retained Siemens to design, build and operate state-of-the-art 2G and 3G nationwide wireless networks. H3I launched its commercial services on 29 March 2007 under the 3 brand.

Indonesia's wireless market consists of a sizable population and a relatively low mobile penetration rate.

At the end of September 2009, H3I's customer base grew to approximately 7.3 million.

In September 2021, it was announced that the latter company would be merged with Ooredoo's Indosat (who operates IM3 Ooredoo networks) to form Indosat Ooredoo Hutchison (IOH) and was closed the merger on 4 January 2022.

=== Hutch Sri Lanka ===
The company's Sri Lankan operation, commonly known as Hutch. CK Hutchison Holdings Limited owns 85% controlling stake of the company while the rest is held by Emirates Telecommunication Group Company PJSC. Initially it was called as "CallLink" and was the second mobile operator in Sri Lanka. Hutchison acquired its services in 1998 with the aim of being a nationwide operator in Sri Lanka. As of September 2018, Hutch has a network coverage of approximately 90% of the entire island. Hutch announced that they acquired Etisalat on 30 November 2018.

Hutch Sri Lanka operates a GSM/EDGE supported network using 900 / 1800 MHz. In 2012 the company launched HSPA+ services using 2100 MHz. The company launched 4G via 1800 MHz B3 from 2018 and 900 MHz B8 from 2019.

=== Vietnamobile ===
In July 2004, Hutchison Telecommunications (Vietnam) S.à r.l. ("Hutchison Telecom Vietnam"), a wholly owned subsidiary of Hutchison Telecom, entered into a business cooperation contract with Hanoi Telecom Joint Stock Company. In February 2005, Hutchison Telecom was granted an investment licence by the government for the project and in January 2007, launched CDMA service under the brand HT Mobile.

While they offered a superior network, the market uptake was greatly hampered by the lack of affordable CDMA handsets, in particular, those with the Vietnamese language option, coupled with the trend of leading manufacturers to scale back handset development for this market.

On 8 March 2008 they received government approval to convert from CDMA technology to GSM. After the successful conversion, it launched GSM services in April 2009 under the new brand "Vietnamobile". The brand surpassed the one million customer mark within six months of launch, mostly in the prepaid segment.

Vietnamobile offers some of the highest growth potential in the region.

== Former operations ==
=== Hutchison India ===
Hutchison Essar Limited started operations under the brand name "Orange" in Mumbai. In other states it was marketed under "Hutch" brand. It was then changed to "Hutch" nationwide when they expanded rapidly to become the third largest mobile service provider in India and furthered its market share through the acquisition of BPL, Fascel, Command & Aircel Digilink. On 31 March 2007 Hutchison Essar Limited (in Hutch Essar) sold its 67.1% stake to Vodafone.

=== Hutchison Orange Israel ===
Even after selling the Orange plc to Mannesmann AG in February 1999, Hutchison continued to use Orange brand in Israel. Recently they have sold the controlling stake in this venture to Scailex Corporation. Thus it ends the story of Orange brand associated with Hutchison Telecom. Though Scailex Corp are still using this brand for their Operations.

=== Hutch Thailand ===
In 2000, Hutchison Telecom and CAT Telecom Public Company Limited ("CAT Telecom") entered into a joint venture by establishing Hutchison CAT Wireless MultiMedia Ltd. ("Hutchison CAT") to provide exclusive marketing services for CAT Telecom's CDMA mobile telecommunications in 25 provinces located in the Bangkok Metropolitan Area and in central, east coast and west coast regions of Thailand.

In 2003, Hutchison CAT launched marketing services for CAT Telecom's CDMA mobile services under the brand Hutch, providing high speed voice and data wireless service to customers.

In 2013 Hutch Thailand has ended its CDMA services.
