= Inq Mobile =

Software companies of the United Kingdom

Coordinates: 51.4799°N 0.1696°W

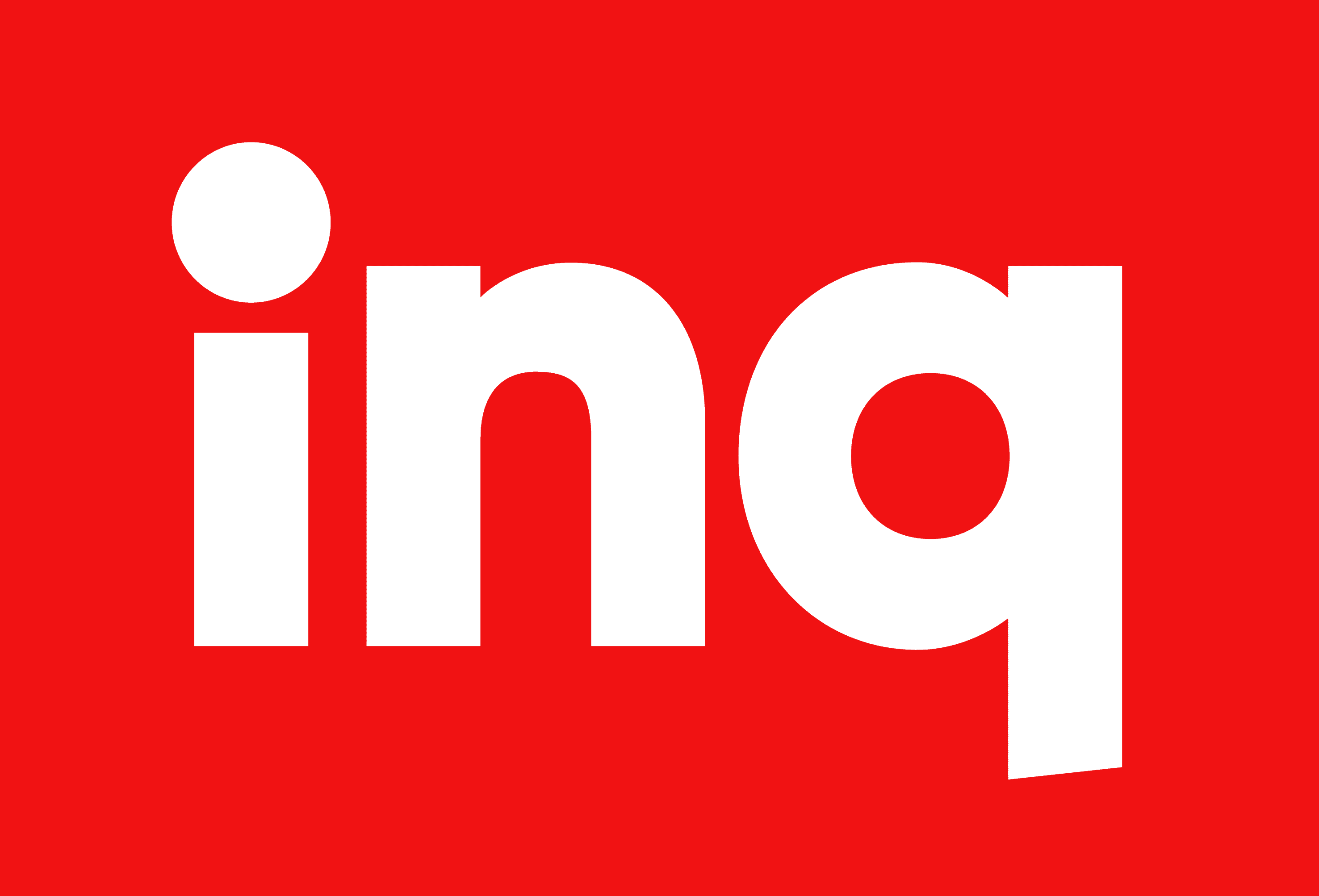
- Type: Subsidiary
- Industry: Communications
- Founded: 2008
- Defunct: 31 January 2014
- Headquarters: Battersea, London, United Kingdom
- Key people: Ken Johnstone (CEO and Co-founder), Tom Mansbridge (Head of Marketing), Simon Davies (Head of Product Management), David Powell (Head of User Experience)
- Products: Social software, App
- Parent: Hutchison Whampoa
- Website: inqmobile.com

Inq was a social software and app manufacturer who launched two successful software products and a series of award-winning handsets. Material, Inq's personalised magazine, became the top free news app in the UK App Store and achieved a number 4 position in the US, shortly after launch. SO.HO, a social launcher developed by Inq, was also warmly received with press positioning it as an alternative to Facebook Home.

Prior to focusing on software, Inq released a series of "social mobiles" for which they were awarded "Best Newcomer" and "Best Handset" at the GSMA in 2009.

In January 2014 Inq announced the business was closing down and the apps in market would no longer be updated.

== Company Overview ==
Inq held offices in London and Rome and employed between 11 and 50 staff across the two offices.

The company was founded in 2007 by Ken Johnstone (Inq's current CEO), Frank Meehan and Jeff Taylor. It is a fully owned subsidiary of Hutchison Whampoa and is backed by Li Ka-shing who is Chairman of Hutchison Whampoa and is also an investor in Facebook and Spotify.

== Inq Software and Apps ==
Inq launched two software only products in 2013; Material a discovery app that delivered each of its users a personalised magazine based on their interests and SO.HO, a launcher and app that brought together Facebook, Twitter and Instagram in one place. Shortly after its release, the Material iOS app became a and achieved a number 4 rank in the Free News chart in the US app store.

Inq describe their apps as social software and parts of the functionality are based on surfacing social networks or using elements from the social graph.

=== Material ===
Inq describe Material as a "personalised magazine" that "hunts out content based on your interests". The app delivers a fresh update of content twice a day, grouping each delivery into a "morning/evening edition" The topics and stories in each edition are personalised to match the interests of each user and users can also add topics via a menu. The more a user uses Material, the more it learns about his or her interests. Users may also add additional topics of interest. In a press release regarding the product, CEO Ken Johnstone positioned Material as an anti-dote to content overload stating "With the avalanche of content out there, we're focused on finding new and exciting ways for people to get directly to the things they love. Material was the result of this thinking, an app that takes all the hard work out of finding great stuff.” and Inq state that the discovery app will help users "discover new content from new places". Material is available for iPhone and Android smartphones.

Inq released Material in BETA as an Android only product. The BETA app was praised by press for "its colorful and intelligent design" and UI. Similarly the Android public showed an interest in the app with the BETA achieving over 50,000 installs. In August 2014 Inq launched an iOS version of Material which had a redesigned UI and improvements to Inq's “interest extraction engine,” which forms the intelligence behind the app. Shortly after its release, the Material iOS app became a number 1 app in the Free News category and achieved a rank of number 4 rank in the Free News chart in the US app store.

The app has been compared by press to other personalised news services such as Flipboard and Zite. In a review of the Material app, VentureBeat commented "While there are quite a few news-reading apps out there and Flipboard holds the dominant position, Material sets itself apart with design and intelligent curation." Unlike Flipboard, the makers of MATERIAL claim it will "evolve with you", learning what you like and recognising when your interests change

=== SO.HO ===
The mobile launcher, SO.HO was launched by Inq for Android devices in 2013 The interface was designed by Chris Kelly. SO.HO allows the user to have Facebook, Instagram and Twitter feeds on their homescreen, additionally the homescreen app allows for tweets, status updates, likes and comments to be made through the launcher. The launcher provides the user a full screen version of their respective Twitter, Instagram and Facebook networks after they unlock their phone, in a similar manner to Facebook Home or HTC Blinkfeed. SO.HO is available in English, Spanish (Europe/US) Portuguese, Korean, Hindi, Italian, German and French. In press commentary about the launcher, Inq initially stated that they intend to add more social networks to the launcher. However more recent updates to the app have added in bespoke social media feeds that mix content from multiple networks in one view. The SO.HO feed is described by Ina as "a place where you can see the latest videos, pictures and links shared from all your friends across Facebook, Twitter and Instagram." whilst the "Hashtag feed" shows users "the conversations happening right now across Facebook, Twitter and Instagram about that subject".

== Inq Phones ==
When it was founded in 2007, Inq's business model focused on creating affordable, mid-range smartphones which deeply integrated social networking and a range of usability features. Inq phones were sold in Canada, India, Singapore, UK, Austria, Australia, Hong Kong, Ireland, Italy and Sweden.

As per news reports, Singapore Telecommunications (Singtel), on 14 September 2009 announced that it would be start selling the social networking phone INQ Mini 3G, developed by INQ mobile. This phone launched on 19 September 2009 in Singapore. On 18 March 2010 Aircel in India started selling the INQ Mini and INQ Chat, and on 28 July 2010 the INQ Chat went on sale in Canada from Telus and Koodo.

In January 2013 Inq announced that they would no longer manufacture handsets but would focus exclusively on producing social software. A Venturebeat article at CES quoted Ken Johnston as saying that “We’ve finished up with hardware a year ago, and we’ve been working our app engine since then,” Inq CEO and cofounder Ken Johnstone said last night at a CES 2013 event. Inq stated on their Facebook page that they will not be making further handsets but that they will continue to support those who own an Inq handset.

=== INQ1 ===
The INQ1 was INQ's first mobile phone. It was released in December 2008, featuring a 2.2" QVGA screen, and a 3.2megapixel camera. Applications on the phone include: Skype, Last.fm, eBay, Facebook, Myspace and Windows Live Messenger.

=== INQ Mini 3G ===
The follow on from the INQ1, this time with added Twitter functionality. Sharing a similar design to its 'sister' phone the Chat 3G, interchangeable back covers are available to purchase. The phone has a 2.0megapixel camera and was launched at £39.99 in the UK. The INQ1 is notable for its very tight integration with Windows Live Messenger, Facebook and Skype. It was endorsed at launch by Mark Zuckerberg and other industry identities.

A high level of firmware branding is present in the phone's operating system, this signifies a push for highly proprietary "for the network, by the network" mobile telephones which are extremely hard to unlock or debrand. In September 2009 Inq publicly stated that the company would build phones based on the Android mobile operating system, and claims they will be ready in early 2011.

=== INQ Chat 3G ===
The 'big sister' to the Mini 3G, featuring similar functionality. However, the phone has an additional QWERTY keyboard, a 3.2megapixel camera and a GPS device.

=== Inq Cloud Touch ===
The first of INQ's new Android-powered phones, moving away from BREW used in their previous phones. The mobile has more integration to Facebook than the previous phones, with direct access from the homescreen to popular aspects like Chat and Places. This is also the first INQ phone to feature Spotify, which replaces a proprietary music player altogether. The Cloud Touch has a button dedicated to Spotify so you can access immediately, in addition to an 'Info' button for quick access to settings and information. The phone has a 3.5" HVGA touchscreen, and will be available in three different colours from April in the UK.

Social networks and related services embedded into Inq phones

- Facebook
- Skype
- Last.fm
- Windows Live Messenger
- Twitter
- doubleTwist
- Orkut (India)

== History ==
Inq was founded in 2008 by Ken Johnstone, Frank Meehan and Jeff Taylor. In August 2009, the company launched two phones-the INQ Mini 3G (a candy-bar type form factor with Twitter and Facebook) and the INQ Chat 3G (a QWERTY device with Twitter, Facebook and Gmail integration). Both models went on sale in Q4 2009 and feature removable coloured back panels. The INQ1 won Phone of the Year at the 2009 GSMA Awards in Barcelona which are known informally as the industry Oscars. The judges highlighted the handset's affordability, deep integration of social networks and ease of use in their winner's announcement.

In September 2010 news reports speculated about rumors that Facebook and Inq were working together on a “Facebook Phone”. To date no Facebook phone has emerged from either Inq or Facebook themselves.

In June 2011 it was reported that Jeff Taylor had left the company to start his own venture with Inq PR Head Soheb Panja This was followed by an announcement in September 2011 that Frank Meehan had been replaced as CEO by Ken Johnstone, co-founder and formerly Director of Products for Inq.

In January 2013 Inq announced that they would be focusing exclusively on producing social software moving forward and would no longer be involved in the manufacture or distribution of handsets. A Venturebeat article at CES quoted Ken Johnston as saying that “We’ve finished up with hardware a year ago, and we’ve been working our app engine since then,” Inq CEO and cofounder Ken Johnstone said last night at a CES 2013 event. This announcement was followed by a company rebrand, at which the company redesigned its logo and began to write the company name as Inq Mobile rather than the original INQ.

Inq launched a beta version of MATERIAL, a content discovery engine in February 2013. In an interview with Pocket-lint MATERIAL was positioned as a continuation of the Inq business, rather than a pivot from phones, with Pocket-Lint writing that "Inq is no stranger to "social DNA". The brief foray into devices with the INQ Cloud Touch back in 2011 very much centred on a granular integration of services like Facebook, helping important content rise to the surface. That ethos still sits at the core of what Inq is working on.". Other titles presented MATERIAL as a "pivot" for Inq, suggesting a change in business strategy.

Inq followed this with the launch a second beta app, SO.HO in May 2013. SO.HO (short for Social Homescreen) is an Android launcher. On the Inq Mobile blog, Inq say that SO.HO "allows you to put your favourite social networks on the homescreen of your Android mobile so that you can check what’s happening on multiple social networks without diving in and out of apps."

In August 2013 Inq launched the iOS version of Material and brought the Android version of Material out of beta. The launch of Material for iPhone was covered by many key press titles including Engagdet, TechCrunch and Venturebeat.

As of 31 January 2014 they have ceased operations, the last issue of Material was on the 28th. SO.HO will continue to work but will no longer be offered/updated.
