= 3 (company) =

Global telecommunications brand

Hutchison 3G Enterprises S.A.R.L.
- Trade name: 3 (Three); Hutchison 3G (H3G)
- Type: Subsidiary
- Industry: Telecommunications
- Founded: 3 March 2003; 23 years ago
- Founder: Hutchison Whampoa
- Headquarters: Hong Kong (owner headquarters); Luxembourg (intellectual property management company headquarters)
- Areas served: Austria (Drei Austria); Denmark (3 Danmark); Hong Kong (3 Hong Kong); Indonesia (Tri Indonesia); Ireland (Three Ireland); Italy (WINDTRE); Sweden (Tre Sverige)
- Key people: Canning Fok (chairman)
- Products: Mobile telephony; fixed telephony
- Parent: CK Hutchison Holdings
- Website: www.three.com

Hutchison 3G Enterprises S.A.R.L., commonly known as Hutchison 3G (acronym H3G) and trading as 3 (Three), is the owner of a brand name that operates several mobile phone networks and broadband Internet providers in Hong Kong, Austria, Denmark, Indonesia, Ireland, Italy, Sweden, and the United Kingdom. The brand was officially founded on 3 March 2003 in Hong Kong. As of 2022, registered Three customers worldwide numbered over 110 million.

Most 3-branded network companies (except the United Kingdom, which its owned by Vodafone) are wholly-owned subsidiaries of CK Hutchison Holdings (formerly Hutchison Whampoa) but the ownership structure varies. CK Hutchison Holdings owns direct majority interests of six networks through 3 Group Europe, including Austria, Denmark, Italy, Ireland and Sweden. Hutchison Telecommunications Hong Kong Holdings operates the networks in Hong Kong, while Hutchison Telecommunications International operates the network in Indonesia. All 3-branded networks provide 4G and 3G services; some also run 2G networks and 5G services. CK Hutchison Holdings no longer holds a 3G licence in Israel, which was formerly operated under the brand Orange, or in Norway, where an unused licence was previously held by 3 Scandinavia.

== Etymologies and logo ==
During the launch of the brand in 2002, when Hutchison Whampoa sold its 2G business to Orange, the brand name 3 (Three) represented their new 3G services. In 2003, CK Hutchison Holdings stated that the name refers to their three global telecommunication services: 3G, GSM Dualband and CDMA. The logo, which is a visual representation of the number "3", was originally three-dimensional and orange in colour. Throughout the years of operation, it has had different versions. In 2009, it was unified into a flat black and white logo. The company describes the logo's design philosophy as "cool outside and hot inside".

== International operations ==
=== Hutchison Telecommunications Hong Kong Holding ===
==== Hong Kong ====
3 Hong Kong is operated by Hutchison Telecommunications Hong Kong Holdings, a subsidiary of CK Hutchison Holdings. In May 2004, its affiliated 2G operator, Orange, re-branded its services and changed its name to 3 Dualband, referring to the GSM product, and 3 CDMA, referring to the CDMA product. On 29 May 2008, Hutchison Telecommunications Hong Kong Holdings announced that it has signed an agreement with Apple to bring the iPhone to Hong Kong later that year under 3. In 2012, a partnership with Vodafone was launched and 3 Hong Kong is a member of the Conexus Mobile Alliance.

Ownership:

- Hutchison Telecommunications International: 70.9%
- NTT DoCoMo: 24.1%
- NEC: 5%

=== Hutchison Telecommunications International ===
==== Indonesia ====
Tri Indonesia was founded as a company in 2000, received a 3G licence in 2003, and began operations on 29 March 2007, initially in the Jakarta area only. Only after 9 months of operations, 3 acquired about 2.2 million GSM customers. 3 achieved high customer mindshare maintaining at about 90% of brand awareness level as of April 2009.

As of April 2009, 3 Indonesia had about 4.5 million customers on its GSM network. 3 offers both pre-paid and post-paid (contract) services. Currently, the post-paid service is available in Jakarta, Bandung, and Surabaya area. 3 currently has full GSM coverage in Java, Sumatera, Bali, Lombok, and Riau Islands. And as of April 2009, Kalimantan is covered in South Kalimantan and Sulawesi is covered in South Sulawesi. By 2009, the 3 UMTS/HSDPA service was available in most parts of Java, especially big cities like Jakarta, Surabaya, Bandung.

3 Indonesia launched its new unlimited text and MMS service for a fee with Facebook on 8 April 2009, so registered 3 customers can update status, write on their "wall", or upload new pictures free of charge. Besides Facebook, 3 also cooperated with Yahoo! to give unlimited chat for a fee by SMS and downloadable app using Yahoo! Messenger service. Both of these were the first of their kind in Indonesia. In 2013, Charoen Pokphand divested its telecommunication business in Indonesia by selling its share of 3 to Garibaldi Thohir and private equity firm which jointly owned by Patrick Walujo and Glenn Sugita Northstar Group. In September 2021, it was announced that the latter company would be merged with Indosat (which operates the IM3 networks); the merger closed on 4 January 2022 with Indosat as the surviving entity.

Ownership of Indosat:

- Ooredoo Hutchison Asia: 65,6% (jointly owned by Ooredoo and Hutchison Telecommunications International)
- The Government of Indonesia: 9,6%

=== 3 Group Europe ===
==== Austria ====
Drei Austria started operations in May 2003. The company promised to have 95% population coverage with HSDPA end of 2007. By 2008, 3's 3G coverage reached 94% of the population. Outside the coverage of its own 3G-network (UMTS/HSDPA/HSPA+) it relies on national roaming on the network of T-Mobile Austria (before Mid-2012, the network of A1 was used for national roaming). 3 Austria is the first in Austria to offer its customers so called "HD Mobile TV" based on the H.264 encoding standard, and won IIR telcon awards for their eBay (2006) and Xseries Gold (2007) offerings. 3 Austria won a DVB-H license and launched the service in June 2008, with three devices and free usage of Mobile TV. In September 2010 – The number of 1 million customers were exceeded. In November 2011, 3 Austria launched HD voice, as well as LTE

In January 2012, 3 Austria announced its national roaming agreement with T-Mobile, which will introduce from July 2012. Customers of 3 Austria will be able to roam on T-Mobile's GSM-network where 3's GSM-network is not available. Simultaneous clients of T-Mobile (including tele.ring) will be able to roam on 3's UMTS-network where T-Mobile's UMTS-network is not available. The roaming agreement with A1 will be continued parallel until year-end. On 3 February 2012 Hutchison Whampoa announced that it had bought Orange for US$1.7 billion, from France Télécom which owned a 35% stake, and private equity firm Mid Europa Partners, which held the remaining 65%. The combined business will create a mobile carrier with 2.8 million customers and more than 20 percent market share in Austria. JPMorgan Chase advised Hutchison on the deal, while Morgan Stanley advised France Télécom and Mid Europa Partners.

==== Denmark and Sweden ====
3 Danmark and Tre Sverige have a common network covering most of the two countries. Customers are "at home" on both networks, i.e. Danish customer receive calls from Denmark without paying roaming fees when they are on 3 Sweden's network and it does not cost extra to call Danish telephone numbers. 3 Scandinavia also previously had a license to build a network in Norway, but in 2011 decided against launching a 3G network in Norway. In 2008 both operations showed a positive EBITDA. In Sweden a small part of the UMTS2100 mobile network is shared with Telenor - except for cities like Stockholm, Gothenburg, Malmö, Lund and Karlskrona where they handle their own 3G networks. In spring 2011, Three started, without Telenor, to build their own 3G Network on the UMTS 900-band which will give a bigger coverage. UMTS 900 and LTE 800 is rolled out using the same base stations.

Today 3 Sweden covers about 98.5% of the Swedish population. In May 2012, 3 Sweden launched its first LTE services. The network uses the TDD2600, FDD2600, FDD2100 and FDD800 bands. The network was launched with ZTE and according to ZTE, this is the world's first LTE network to use both FDD and TDD at the same time. Later it was switched to Huawei and Ericsson and as of now in July 2022 with the roll out of 5G the whole network is changed to Ericsson and Nokia Networks, due to the ban of using Huawei to build a 5G-network. At the beginning of 2022, 3 Sweden was Sweden's fastest growing mobile operator. 3 Sweden also operates its own lower-cost flanker brand Hallon, launched in 2013.

3 Denmark and 3 Sweden has "3 Like Home" which makes it possible to use the phone as home in 50+ countries like (Austria, Cyprus, USA, Sweden, Norway, Finland, Ireland, UK, Spain, Portugal, Malta, Puerto Rico, Greece, San Marino, Singapore, Switzerland, Netherlands, France, Hong Kong, Italy, Luxembourg, Liechtenstein, and Germany).

Ownership:

- Hutchison Whampoa: 60%
- Investor: 40%

==== Ireland ====
Three Ireland launched on 26 July 2005 as Ireland's fourth mobile network operator behind Vodafone, O2 and Meteor. Service was initially offered as post-paid only, but on 16 May 2006 the introduction of a pre-paid service, known as 3Pay, was announced. Three operates 2G, 3G, 4G and 5G services. Until 2015, Three had a roaming agreement with Vodafone to provide 2G coverage where its original 3G network was unavailable. On 24 June 2013, it was announced that CK Hutchison Holdings would acquire Telefónica's Irish mobile operations, O2, for €780 million, to be merged into Three Ireland upon completion of the deal. The European Commission approved the merger in 2014. The O2 brand was phased out and its operations fully merged into Three on 2 March 2015.

On 27 January 2014, Three launched its 4G network in Dublin, Cork, Galway, Limerick, Wexford and Waterford. By March 2014, Three had expanded its 4G coverage to a further 11 towns. In 2016, Three started rolling out 4G+ claiming peak speeds of 225 Mbit/s. 4G coverage currently sits at 97.3% as of March 2020. On 28 September 2020, Three launched its 5G network, claiming 35% population coverage on day one. Three has stated that this service will be available in 121 locations but coverage is expected to expand over time.

==== Italy ====
3 Italy (formerly known as Andala) was founded in November 1999 and controlled by Sardinian Internet company Tiscali, Franco Bernabè and Sanpaolo IMI. It was the first Italian mobile operator to offer 3G services (UMTS), launched in March 2003. As of March 2010, 3 Italy had 9 million registered customers. It had a roaming agreement with TIM which allowed its customers to get a 2G service when they moved out of 3G coverage, allowing 3 to offer coverage to up to 99.8% of the population on 2G service. On 22 February 2006, 3 announced the first launch of HSDPA technology in Italy, marketed as "ADSM" (a contraction of "ADSL Mobile"). On 14 May 2006, 3 was the first in Italy to launch digital mobile TV using DVB-H technology. From June 2008 to November 2011, 3 Italy offered free of charge the viewing of Rai 1, Rai 2, Canale 5, Italia 1, Rete 4, Sky Meteo24, Current TV and La7 television channels with DVB-H technology.

In 2015, CK Hutchison Holdings and VimpelCom agreed to merge their telecommunications businesses in Italy – 3 Italy and Wind Telecomunicazioni – and this was completed in December 2016. The resulting company, 50% owned by each partner, rebranded as Wind Tre and had around 31 million mobile customers at the start of 2017, making it the country's largest mobile operator. In 2018, CK Hutchison acquired the 50% stake owned by VEON (formerly VimpelCom), to gain 100% ownership of Wind Tre. In the Italian market, services are now offered under the unified brand, officially unveiled on 6 March and commercially launched on 16 March 2020.

=== Separately-owned ===
==== United Kingdom ====
Three UK launched as the UK's first commercial video mobile network on 3 March 2003, the day that 3G services went live across the country, and handsets went on sale later that month. On 9 December 2004, Three announced that it was the first network to meet its regulatory requirement of 80% population coverage in the UK. Three operated 3G, 4G and 5G services, and had a national roaming agreement with EE to provide 2G services where 3G was unavailable (until 2006, Three partnered with O2 for these services). 2G fallback coverage was largely dropped as 3G became ubiquitous. On 24 March 2015, Three announced its intention to acquire the UK operations of Spanish operator O2 for £10.25 billion but a year later, the EU Commission blocked the takeover.

Three's first retail stores (branded 3Store) opened at the same time as the network launched, in London's Oxford Street and Kensington High Street, and at the Birmingham Mailbox. Three's handsets and contracts were also sold by mobile telephony chains and independents, as well as online retailers. In 2005, an expansion of the 3Store portfolio saw stores opened in larger malls throughout the UK, such as the Bluewater shopping centre, and The Mall at Cribbs Causeway near Bristol. In October 2006, Three announced that it had purchased 95 high street shops from O2 and The Link. Three's UK division was owned entirely by CK Hutchison Holdings. In June 2023, it was announced that, subject to regulatory approval Vodafone UK and Three UK would merge to create Britain's biggest mobile network, with Vodafone owning 51% and CK Hutchison Holdings owning 49% of the new service. The merger received antitrust approval from the UK Competition and Markets Authority in December 2024, and VodafoneThree was established in June 2025.

In May 2026, CK Hutchison agreed to sell their 49% stake to Vodafone Group for £4.3bn, subject to regulatory approval, to allow Vodafone Group to become the sole owner of VodafoneThree. The transaction completed on 30 July 2026.

== Past 3-branded networks ==
=== Australia ===
Hutchison launched the Three Australia network in 2003. It operated a 2,100 MHz 3G network in a 50/50 partnership with Telstra (the radio networks were shared while the core networks were separate), covering approximately 56% of Australia's population. The 3G network covered Sydney, Melbourne, Brisbane, Adelaide, Perth, the Gold Coast, Canberra, Geelong, Frankston and Wollongong. On 9 February 2009, Three and Vodafone announced that they would be merging their Australian operations into a 50–50 joint venture called Vodafone Hutchison Australia. All products and services offered by VHA would be marketed under the Vodafone brand. The merger was approved by shareholders and regulators on 29 May 2009, and Vodafone Hutchison Australia was established in June 2009. The Three and Vodafone networks remained separate until August 2009. Vodafone phased out the Three brand from late 2011 onwards. No new registrations to the Three brand were made after this time, and from 30 August 2013, all Three Mobile systems and accounts were closed.

Hutchison formerly operated an Australian CDMA network under the Orange brand name, as Orange One. It allowed customers to use their 3-branded CDMA mobile phone as a home phone when at home. Calls made from their mobile were charged at rates similar to those of a landline. Customers also received a "Local Zone" number allowing them to be called on a landline number whilst at home. Should the phone be out of the Local Zone, calls made to the landline number either diverted to the mobile number at a small fee, or was directed to voicemail on the mobile handset. These plans started at a very competitive price of $10.00 per month, and local calls from within the Local Zone to a local landline was charged at 20c per local call, making their service cheaper than those of Telstra or Optus. The Orange One network was not as vast as others, and so Orange made arrangements with Telstra to allow the services of Orange One devices to roam to the Telstra network. On 1 February 2006, it was rebranded as 3 CDMA, and this network was closed as of 9 August 2006. 3 CDMA customers were offered special tariffs and incentives to continue as customers on the 3G network; all customers either moved over to 3's 3G network or to other network providers.

=== Macau ===
3 Macau launched in 2000 providing GSM dual-band services. In 2007, they launched 3G services. In 2008, 3 Macau brought the iPhone to Macau an agreement with Apple. Till now, they are providing 4G services. In the 2G and 3G eras, it was the second largest mobile operator in Macau. In the 2G era, its market share was approximately 31%, as of 31 December 2003. In the 3G era, its market share was approximately 33% in terms of the number of customers, as of 31 December 2008. 3 Macau is the only carrier to offer VoWiFi in Macau.

Hutchison sold Macau business to CTM, the largest telecom operator in Macau, on 12 Jan 2026. 3 Macau currently still operates as a separate company, but will cease operation on 1 December 2026.

== Services ==
=== Internet access ===
Like other mobile-provider Internet home pages, 3's portal is 'free to browse' for some content in most 3 countries including Ireland, UK and Australia in most price plans; the user pays a fixed price for each video, text or application downloaded. Besides that, 3 UK and also 3 Ireland initially made the decision to block direct Internet access from handsets, while 3 Austria allowed access to the Internet since the beginning. In 2004, 3 released a PC Card 3G Data Card ("NetConnect Card") for Windows-based laptops which allows Internet access through 3's network directly from the computer, accompanied by a range of data and business tariffs. Later, more cards and USB modems for HSDPA were introduced.

=== 3 Skypephones and Skype on 3 ===
In November 2007, 3 started to sell the Skypephone, which was developed in conjunction with the Chinese phone manufacturer Amoi and Skype, combining the functionality of a UMTS handset with free voice calls and instant messages from Skype. The phones were sold exclusively by 3 on contract and on a prepaid basis. 3 also produced an application called "Skype on 3" which brought the same functionality to S60 and J2ME-capable phones (but not iPhone or Android, although some unofficial Android versions were distributed). Unlike the non-3 versions of mobile Skype, "Skype on 3" does not use the phone's data connection for voice calls, but instead places a normal phone call to a special number which 3 make available for this service. 3 does not charge users for calls to this number. This service is available in Australia, Ireland and the UK; it has been discontinued in Austria, Denmark, Hong Kong, Italy and Sweden.

A company called iSkoot was behind at least some of the clients and back-end servers but iSkoot announced a shutdown scheduled for 20 January 2011. It appears this shutdown initially affected the J2ME version and some Skypephones (which now show a "click to upgrade" link which either doesn't function or takes you to a page saying an upgrade is not available), but some S60 versions were not affected. Skype have started sending emails indicating the Skype on 3 service will be terminated on 30 September 2014, in spite of Three's original "free for life" advertising. The recommended clients for smartphones will use the phone's data connection which may be liable to charges, instead of the dedicated access number used by the client, which was free to call.

=== Roaming packages ===
In February 2007, 3 introduced '3 Like Home', a service that in theory allows subscribers to use any 3-branded network (with the exception of 3 Indonesia) without having to pay additional roaming charges, instead paying the same amount for voice, data, and messaging services as they would do on their home network. This also allows users to use their free or inclusive bundles and allowances while abroad; however, pre-pay customers do not benefit fully, as they cannot use each 3 branded network for "3 Like Home". This arrangement is possible because of the roaming agreements between the networks, which provide service to other partners' customers free of internal roaming charges. This means that the marginal cost of a roaming call is much the same as a call on the home network.

- At the end of April 2009, 3 UK announced that '3 Like Home' would no longer be available to customers of the 3 UK network from 30 June 2009. On 7 April 2010, 3 Sweden announced that '3 Like Home' would be discontinued on 23 May 2010.
- On 19 August 2013, 3 Austria announced at a press conference that '3 Like Home' would no longer be available for new customers, following their acquisition of Orange Austria. Existing plans were unaffected.
- On 30 August 2013, 3 UK launched "Feel at Home" for UK customers visiting Australia, Italy, Denmark, Austria, Sweden, Hong Kong and Ireland, where calls, texts and data are charged at their standard UK rate. The list of countries was later extended:
  - 4 December 2013 – Indonesia, Macau, Sri Lanka and the USA
  - 1 July 2014 – France, Finland, Israel, Norway and Switzerland
  - 1 April 2015 – New Zealand and Spain
  - 8 September 2016 – a further 24 European destinations, including Germany, Portugal and Greece
  - 15 June 2017 – Brazil and Singapore
- In Sept 2014, 3 Denmark added France, Germany, Norway and Switzerland to its "Roam Like Home" package.
  - May 2015 − added Portugal, Malta, Greece, Cyprus and Spain
  - November 2015 – added USA and Singapore
- On 1 April 2017, 3 Ireland announced that they were discontinuing their '3 Like Home' service, later announcing they would instead provide a "Roam Like Home" experience to Pay As You Go customers, allowing them to use their flexi units and a "chunk" of their data within the 30 EEA countries together with Andorra, Monaco, Norway, Switzerland, San Marino and UK. On Bill Pay Plans this scheme includes the 30 EEA countries together with Andorra, the Isle of Man, Jersey, Guernsey, Gibraltar, Monaco, San Marino, UK and Vatican City. This was introduced as part of Regulation (EU) No 531/2012 which abolished roaming charges within the European Union.

== See also ==
- List of mobile network operators in Europe
