= Hutchison Whampoa =

Hong Kong holding company

Hutchison Whampoa 和記黃埔
- Industry: Conglomerate
- Founded: 1863; 163 years ago
- Founder: John Duflon Hutchison
- Defunct: 3 June 2015; 11 years ago
- Fate: Merged with Cheung Kong Holdings
- Successor: CK Hutchison Holdings
- Headquarters: Central, Hong Kong
- Products: Ports and related services; property and hotels; retail; energy; infrastructure; telecommunications, finance & investment
- Revenue: US$54.035 billion (2014)
- Net income: ▲HK$67.16 billion (US$8.66 billion) (2014); HK$31.11 billion ($4.01 billion) (2013)
- Number of employees: 253,983 (2011)
- Website: www.hutchison-whampoa.com

Hutchison Whampoa
- Traditional Chinese: 和記黃埔
- Simplified Chinese: 和记黄埔
Transcriptions
Standard Mandarin
- Hanyu Pinyin: Héjì Huángpǔ
Yue: Cantonese
- Jyutping: wo^{4}gei^{3}wong^{4}bou^{3}

Hutchison Whampoa Limited (HWL) was an investment holding company based in Hong Kong. It was a Fortune Global 500 company and one of the largest companies listed on the Hong Kong Stock Exchange. HWL was an international corporation with a diverse array of holdings which included the world's biggest port, and telecommunication operations in 14 countries that were run under the 3 brand. Its businesses also included retail, property development, and infrastructure.

Formed in 1863 and 1877 respectively by British entrepreneurs, it was sold in 1979 to Li Ka-shing, a Hong Kong businessman. In 2015, the company merged with Cheung Kong Group as part of a major reorganisation of the group's businesses. The combined business was renamed CK Hutchison Holdings.

== History ==
Hutchison Whampoa originated as two separate companies, both founded in the 19th century. Hong Kong and Whampoa Dock was formed in 1863 by John Couper, as a port management company. Hutchison International, a wholesale trading company and importer of consumer products, was founded in 1877 by John Duflon Hutchison.

In 1965, Hutchison International under the leadership of Sir Douglas Clague gained a controlling interest of Hong Kong and Whampoa Dock. He pursued an aggressive path of diversification, acquiring A.S. Watson, Davie, Boag and Co. Ltd., Hong Kong and Whampoa Dock Co. Ltd., and China Provident Co. Ltd. A decade later, however, the conglomerate reported losses of HK$130 million and became unable to service its growing debt.

In 1975, Clague lost control of Hutchison Whampoa due to disastrous speculation on foreign currency and stock markets. HSBC refused to bail out the company. HSBC took a 22% stake in the company and replaced Clague. In 1977, Hutchison Whampoa Limited was formed as a result of merger between Hutchison International Limited and Hong Kong and Whampoa Dock Company Limited. A year later Hutchison Whampoa was listed on the stock exchange.

In 1979, Michael Sandberg convinced G. M. Sayer to not hand over a restructured Hutchison Whampoa to another British firm. The bank instead sold off the company on generous terms to Li Ka-shing On 25 September 1979, at the close of trade in London, HSBC announced that it was selling its 22% stake in Hutchison Whampoa to Cheung Kong Holdings for HK$639 million.

During the 1980s, Hutchison Whampoa bought 33% of Hong Kong Electric Holdings. In 1985, Hutchison Telecommunications, a mobile phone service, was launched, which became a major player in telecommunications in the 1990s. By 2004, Li's equity in Hutchison Whampoa had gradually increased to 49.9%.

In March 2011, Hutchison Port Holdings Trust (HPHT) announced that the company would IPO through Singapore Exchange for about US$5.4 billion. This would be the largest offering in South East Asia and surpass Petronas Chemicals' offering of about $4.1 billion.

In January 2015, Li Ka-shing entered into talks with Telefónica to buy its British mobile division, O2, for around $15.4 billion, but the deal was blocked in 2016 by the EU's Competition Commissioner.

In January 2015, Li Ka-shing confirmed plans for Cheung Kong Holdings to purchase the remaining shares in Hutchison Whampoa that it did not already own, and merge the two companies as CK Hutchison Holdings. The merger is part of a larger reorganisation of Li's businesses, which will involve the spin-off of property assets into Cheung Kong Property. The new holding company has been incorporated in the Cayman Islands, rather than Hong Kong.

In May 2015, Hutchison revealed plans to sell one-third of its stake in its British-based mobile phone businesses for a potential fee of $4.3 billion to five investors including GIC Private Limited, Canada Pension Plan Investment Board, Abu Dhabi Investment Authority, BTG Pactual and Caisse de dépôt et placement du Québec.

== Operations ==
HWL operated in 54 countries and employed around 230,000 staff worldwide. The company had six core businesses, most of which transferred to CK Hutchison in 2015:

=== Ports and related services ===
Hutchison Port Holdings (HPH) operated across Europe, the Americas, Asia, the Middle East and Africa. It operated in five of the seven busiest container ports in the world, handling 13% of the world's container traffic. It operated container terminals in Panama, as well as Mexico and other parts of the Americas.

In March 2025, the Li family sold HPH to BlackRock after several weeks of negotiations saying it felt "political pressure" as the Trump administration was pursuing its America First foreign policy.

=== Property and hotels ===
From office buildings in Hong Kong, Beijing, Shanghai, to luxury residential properties in the United Kingdom, Hutchison Whampoa Property develops and invests in real estate. Together with Cheung Kong Holdings, HWL has set up a joint-venture company, Harbour Plaza Hotel Management to operate and manage hotels under the portfolio of the Hutchison Property division.

=== Retail ===
A.S. Watson Group (ASW), HWL's retail arm, operates its flagship retail chains in Asia such as Watsons, ParknShop supermarket, TASTE food galleria, GOURMET boutique style fine food hall, GREAT Food Hall, Fortress electrical appliances store, Watson's Wine Cellar and Nuance-Watson duty-free operator. In Europe, ASW's retail network comprises health and beauty chains: DC, Drogas, Kruidvat, Rossmann, Savers Health & Beauty, Superdrug, Trekpleister, Spektr and Watson's, as well as luxury perfumeries and cosmetics retail brands: Marionnaud, ICI Paris XL and The Perfume Shop. A.S. Watson is the world's largest health and beauty retailer.

=== Infrastructure ===
Cheung Kong Infrastructure (CKI), HWL's infrastructure arm, is a diversified infrastructure company with businesses in transportation, energy, infrastructure materials, water plants and related operations.

=== Energy ===
HWL was a major shareholder of Husky Energy, one of Canada's largest energy and energy related companies, holding 33.97%.

=== Telecommunications ===
HWL owned the "3" brand. It also owns 60.4% of Hutchison Asia Telecommunications (HAT), which provides mobile phone networks and data services in Asia. The company's subsidiary 3 Group Europe owns its '3' branded businesses in Europe. Another 1% of HAT is owned directly by Cheung Kong Holdings, the holding behind Cheung Kong group to which HWL belongs. Additionally, HWL is an official backer of the .mobi top level domain created specifically for the mobile internet and has launched the mobile portal Three.mobi under its "3" brand. Hutchison Whampoa attempted to purchase O2 for £10.25 billion in March 2015, but the European Commission blocked the acquisition in May 2016.

== Criticisms ==
Hutchison Whampoa has received criticism from charities such as the Burma Campaign UK and appear on the charity's 'dirty list' for their involvement in trade with the military junta in Burma. They state that the company's subsidiary Myanmar International Terminals Thilawa (MITT) is "strategically positioned to facilitate and service Myanmar's international trade" and are concerned about the role foreign investment plays in "perpetuating" the country's brutal regime.

== See also ==
- Jardine Matheson Group
- List of charities in the People's Republic of China
- List of companies in Hong Kong
- List of trading companies
- Swire Group
