= Brilliant Classics =

Dutch classical music record label

- Parent company: Edel AG
- Founded: 1996
- Genre: Classical
- Country of origin: Netherlands
- Location: Leeuwarden
- Official website: brilliantclassics.com

Brilliant Classics is a classical music label based in the Dutch town of Leeuwarden. It is renowned for releasing super-budget-priced editions on CD of the complete works of J.S. Bach, Mozart, Beethoven and many other composers. The label also specialises in new recordings of early music, chamber, organ and piano music.

Piano Classics is an imprint of Brilliant Classics, focusing on piano solo repertoire.

== Mission ==
Since its inception, Brilliant Classics has sought to bring art music to the widest possible public by releasing all its recordings at budget and super-budget price. The distribution strategy of selling through supermarkets and drugstores (see History below) introduced classical music to a mass market when most other labels were selling to a specialised audience. One of its best-known sets is the complete works of J.S. Bach on 155 CDs: this has sold more than 500,000 units. Though CD is still the primary medium for Brilliant Classics, all its new releases are available as downloads, and many are available on streaming services.

The mission of Piano Classics is "to present a platform for often young, incredibly gifted pianists presenting themselves to the musical world."

== History ==
The label was founded in 1995, and its artistic director since then has been Pieter van Winkel, a pianist and record producer. Brilliant Classics releases were initially sold exclusively by the retail outlets of Kruidvat, a chain of drugstores in the Netherlands and Belgium. The retail price of each release was very low, encouraging mass consumption in a different business model to the release, distribution and marketing network then prevalent in the classical music world. The success of this venture led to international distribution in other European countries including the UK, where Brilliant Classics releases were sold in the Superdrug chain of stores, and Aldi and Rossmann supermarkets in Germany. In 2007 Brilliant Classics became part of Foreign Media Music, one of the Foreign Media Group (FMG) of companies based in Leeuwarden. In September 2010 the label was sold to a Dutch investment company, Triacta B.V., who performed a 'corporate carve-out' before selling the company on to Edel AG, a German entertainment group with a long presence in the core classical market through its ownership of Berlin Classics. Berlin Classics continues as a division of Edel as well as licensing content to Brilliant Classics. The label is now distributed across Europe and in North America, Australia and Far East.

== Release policy ==
Since 2000, Brilliant Classics has issued more than a hundred releases per year, including on average more than six new recordings each month. The repertoire for new recordings is chosen on the basis of interest for the classical collector, interested in newly available or otherwise unavailable music in genres such as Renaissance and Baroque vocal music, Classical-era chamber music, composers from the turn of the 20th century and Minimalist piano music.

== Box sets ==
Editions presenting either the complete works of a composer or a significant portion of their output are a speciality for Brilliant Classics. By the middle of 2015 the label had released boxed sets dedicated to C.P.E. Bach, J.S. Bach, Beethoven, Berlioz, Boccherini, Borodin, Brahms, Cabezón, Chopin, Corelli, Couperin, Dessau, Dvořák, Eisler, Fauré, Franck, Frescobaldi, Grieg, Handel, Hummel, Haydn, Liszt, Martinu, Mendelssohn, Mozart, Mussorgsky, Rachmaninoff, Rimsky-Korsakov, Rodrigo, Schubert, Schumann, Schütz, Shostakovich, Richard Strauss, Tallis, Tchaikovsky, Telemann and Vivaldi. Not all of these sets are available at any one time owing to licensing restrictions but they are periodically reissued with new contents.

The first of these boxed sets was one dedicated to the music of J.S. Bach. Nearly all the performances within the set were made according to historically informed performance practices, and (most unusually for such large sets) over half the set had been newly recorded for the purpose. This included a complete set of the 199 extant sacred cantatas, recorded over the period of a year by the Holland Boys Choir and their conductor, Pieter Jan Leusink, with the Netherlands Bach Collegium. "The spirit of the task," remarked Gramophone magazine, "is clearly designed to provide a large audience with the opportunity to experience all these masterworks on period instruments, at an affordable price. A ridiculous price actually... In sum, these readings deserve to be recognised, primarily for their attractive and well-measured strides, but also for a lack of dogma or self-importance." The initial editions of 5CD boxes sold over 100,000 copies of each volume within the Netherlands alone.

== Artists ==
Though Brilliant Classics is primarily a repertoire-led label, it has supported several artists whose albums have become best-sellers for the label, and who have found international success through their recordings.

The Hungarian pianist Klára Würtz has recorded the complete sonatas of Mozart, several albums of Schumann, chamber music by Beethoven, Schubert, Schumann and Brahms and concertos by Mozart, Ravel, Rachmaninov and Bartók, among others. The Dutch pianist Bart van Oort has recorded Classical and early Romantic music for the label from J.C. Bach to Chopin and John Field on instruments of the period; the Norwegian pianist Håkon Austbø has recorded albums of Grieg (the complete Lyric Pieces), Scriabin's complete piano sonatas and Janáček's complete piano music. The Italian pianist Costantino Catena has recorded Wolf-Ferrari's piano music and Sonatas for violin and piano.

The Dutch harpsichordist and conductor Pieter-Jan Belder has recorded the complete sonatas of Domenico Scarlatti (according to Classics Today, "Belder's Scarlatti survey offers hours upon hours of listening pleasure, and unquestionably constitutes a major achievement.") and music by Rameau, J.S. Bach, and C.P.E. Bach, as well as the first complete recordings of the sonatas by Antonio Soler and the Fitzwilliam Virginal Book. Other musicians working on the label within the Dutch early-music tradition have included Musica ad Rhenum with their director, the flautist Jed Wentz, and the cellist/conductor Jaap ter Linden, who recorded a complete cycle of Mozart symphonies.

From 2009 onwards, the Dutch pianist Jeroen van Veen has recorded several albums and collections of minimal piano music by composers including Philip Glass, Ludovico Einaudi and Simeon ten Holt. These albums have met with both commercial and critical success: Gramophone magazine described his Pärt album as "absolutely brilliant".

Among the most distinguished artists to record for Brilliant Classics is the Russian conductor Rudolf Barshai, whose cycle of Shostakovich symphonies (recorded 1994–2000) with the WDR Sinfonieorchester Köln was quickly recognised as a leader in its field. According to Classics Today, "Barshai's intelligent, humane, passionate, and deeply felt readings undeniably realize the composer's intentions and certainly will stand the test of time. This Brilliant Classics set is such a bargain you almost feel guilty paying so little for it."

Brilliant Classics has formed several partnerships with historically informed Italian ensembles and musicians, including the violinist Federico Guglielmo with L'Arte dell'Arco; Federico Maria Sardelli with Modo Antiquo; Enrico Casazza with La Magnifica Comunità; the harpsichordist and organist Simone Stella, who has recorded the complete keyboard music of the most important pre-Bachian composers including Buxtehude, Böhm, Reincken, Walther, Froberger and Pachelbel; Federico Bardazzi, with Ensemble San Felice who has recorded Monteverdi's Vespers and Mass, Hildegard von Bingen and El Cant de la Sibilla; and the keyboard player and conductor Roberto Loreggian has recorded albums of J.S. Bach, Telemann and Galuppi as well as leading the Frescobaldi Edition, which gathers on 17CD all the extant music by "one of the greatest composers of the first half of the 17th century".

Young artists on the label include the Dutch recorder virtuoso Erik Bosgraaf, who has made recordings of music from Vivaldi to Boulez; the Spanish lutenist Miguel Yisrael; the Italian organist Stefano Molardi, who has recorded the complete organ works of J.S. Bach; and the Hungarian violinist Kristóf Baráti, who has recorded solo and chamber repertoire from Bach to Brahms and Bartók. The Italian pianist Vanessa Benelli Mosell made her first two recordings for Brilliant Classics (including "impressively refined and nuanced" Liszt: Gramophone).
