= Zava =

British online doctor service and pharmacy

ZAVA
- Formerly: DrEd
- Founded: 30 September 2010; 16 years ago
- Founders: David Meinertz (CEO); Amit Khutti
- Areas served: UK & Europe
- Services: Online doctor service, online pharmacy
- Parent: Health Bridge Ltd
- Website: www.zavamed.com/uk/

ZAVA is the brand name for an online doctor service and online pharmacy Zavamed.com run by the London-based Health Bridge Ltd. Launched in 2011 as DrEd, it was re-branded to ZAVA in 2016.

== History ==
ZAVA was established in 2010 as DrEd.com by former Dr Thom employees David Meinertz and Amit Khutti. Its website was launched in November 2011 in the UK and Germany with two staff doctors. In 2012, the company raised an angel round of $1.4 million. In April 2012, DrEd opened in Austria and launched an emergency contraception delivery service in the UK. On 20 June 2012, DrEd was launched in Switzerland. In early 2014, the business became profitable.

In December 2014, DrEd was launched in Ireland, offering prescriptions for various medications. In June 2016, the service was launched in France under the new brand ZAVA with four French doctors providing online consultations. In September 2018, ZAVA had 155 employees and served patients in six European countries. It was one of the largest digital healthcare companies in Europe having served more than 2 million patients online, including 400,000 from Germany. In 2018 and 2019, British and German media wrote about ZAVA's stockpiling of key medications, in the context of a potential shortage of Viagra Connect caused by Brexit.

In January 2019, DrEd changed its name to ZAVA in Germany. According to the website, the name is derived from the French Ça va? ("How are you?"). The firm also announced plans to open an office in Germany. In June 2019, Health Bridge Ltd., which owns ZAVA, raised $32m (£20m) in a series A round. It aimed to expand its service in Europe and open an office in Hamburg.

== Regulation ==
ZAVA operates under British and European Union laws. In the UK, Health Bridge Ltd., the company that owns zavamed.com, is registered with and regulated by the Care Quality Commission. Health Bridge Limited has a MHRA permission to sell medicines online. Health Bridge Ltd. Pharmacy is registered with the General Pharmaceutical Council.

In Europe, the company operates under the European Directive 2011/24/EC on cross-border healthcare that states that prescriptions written by a doctor registered in one EU member state are recognized in all other member states. However, the legal grounds for ZAVA's services have been questioned in several EU countries. Doctors and pharmacists have highlighted challenges between local doctor treatment and prescription fulfilment from pharmacies due to the European Directive (see "Criticism and controversies").

== Service ==
In the EU, ZAVA offers diagnosis by a doctor using telemedicine and is offering Rx prescriptions, which can be delivered using partner online pharmacies. In the UK, ZAVA has its own in-house registered pharmacy. ZAVA relies on patients filling in a detailed online medical questionnaire which is reviewed by a person from its in-house clinical team. The doctors provide medical consultation and can prescribe medicine. ZAVA has provided 5 million paid consultations since its launch.

== Criticism and controversies ==
=== In Austria ===
In April 2012, when DrEd was launched in Austria it faced opposition from the Minister of Health Alois Stöger, the Austrian chamber of physicians and the Austrian chamber of pharmacists. The Austrian association for patient's rights also expressed its concerns about the quality of service that DrEd may provide.

In January 2013, the Austrian consumer magazine Konsument tested DrEd.com by ordering a gonorrhea treatment and a prescription for a malaria drug. The editors noted that the online doctor "comically" advised a sex worker of the need to inform her sexual partners of the last three months about her STD infection (which the Austrian law requires). In malaria cases, the editors complained that the online doctor gave them an "unnecessary" preventive treatment, because their test patient was supposed to travel only above 2,500 meters altitude, where the disease was not present. The magazine concluded that Austrian patients should absolutely avoid DrEd or any online medicine service, because they "cannot replace the personal meeting between the doctor and the patient".

In 2016, Profil, an Austrian weekly news magazine, tested the DrEd.com service by ordering Viagra and once against expressed concerns around the quality of online consultation and prescription.

=== In Germany ===
In 2011, when the service was launched in Germany, Dirk Heinrich, the chairman of NAV-Virchow-Bund, an association of German physicians, criticized DrEd for prescribing medicines without physical examination. He said that "a diagnosis from an online survey is not a diagnosis, but a guess" and called DrEd "a covert online-pharmacy". In July 2012, Stiftung Warentest, a German consumer organisation, tested DrEd with patients allegedly having bladder infection and chlamydia infection. In both cases antibiotics were prescribed without the urine tests necessary for the diagnosis. DrEd responded with an open letter, questioning the care of the anonymous testers.

In March 2013, the Federal Ministry of Health questioned the legal grounds on which DrEd was operating in Germany. In October 2013, when DrEd reached an agreement with the pharmacy chain Ordermed for the morning-after pill delivery, it was canceled by Ordermed because of its pharmacy partners' objection. In fall 2013, the newly elected Federal government proposed changes to the law, demanding a direct doctor-patient consultation for the initial prescription of medicines, which was sharply criticized by DrEd. In May 2014, the Bavarian Health Minister, Melanie Huml, demanded the Federal government to clarify that online prescriptions made outside of Germany were not valid.

In 2016, the Ministry of Health proposed changes to German legislation demanding personal contact between doctor and patient and a ban on online issued prescriptions, which became popularly known as "Lex DrEd" or "DrEd-Verbot" (DrEd ban). On 11 November 2016, the Bundestag approved these changes. This ban forced DrEd to work with EU pharmacies outside of the country that offered German delivery.

However, in April 2018, the Chamber of Physicians of Schleswig-Holstein changed its code to allow online consultations to the state doctors and, in early May 2018, the change happened on a national level, affirmed by the Federal Congress of German doctors. Also in May 2018, the Chamber of Physicians of Baden-Württemberg approved DrEd as a model project, following its 2016 decision to test telemedicine services within approved model projects where web service is compared to the hospital treatment and evaluated by the Chamber.

=== In the UK and Ireland ===
In 2012, when DrEd launched the morning after pill delivery service in the UK, it was criticized for encouraging underage sex. In 2015, when DrEd began offering STI testing kits online, some doctors criticized the practice, claiming that ordering STI test kits online does not allow patients to receive advice on safe sexual practices the way face-to-face consultations do. In September 2021, ZAVA partnered with Asda to launch Asda Online Doctor.
