= Armida al campo d'Egitto =

Opera by Antonio Vivaldi

- Opera by Antonio Vivaldi
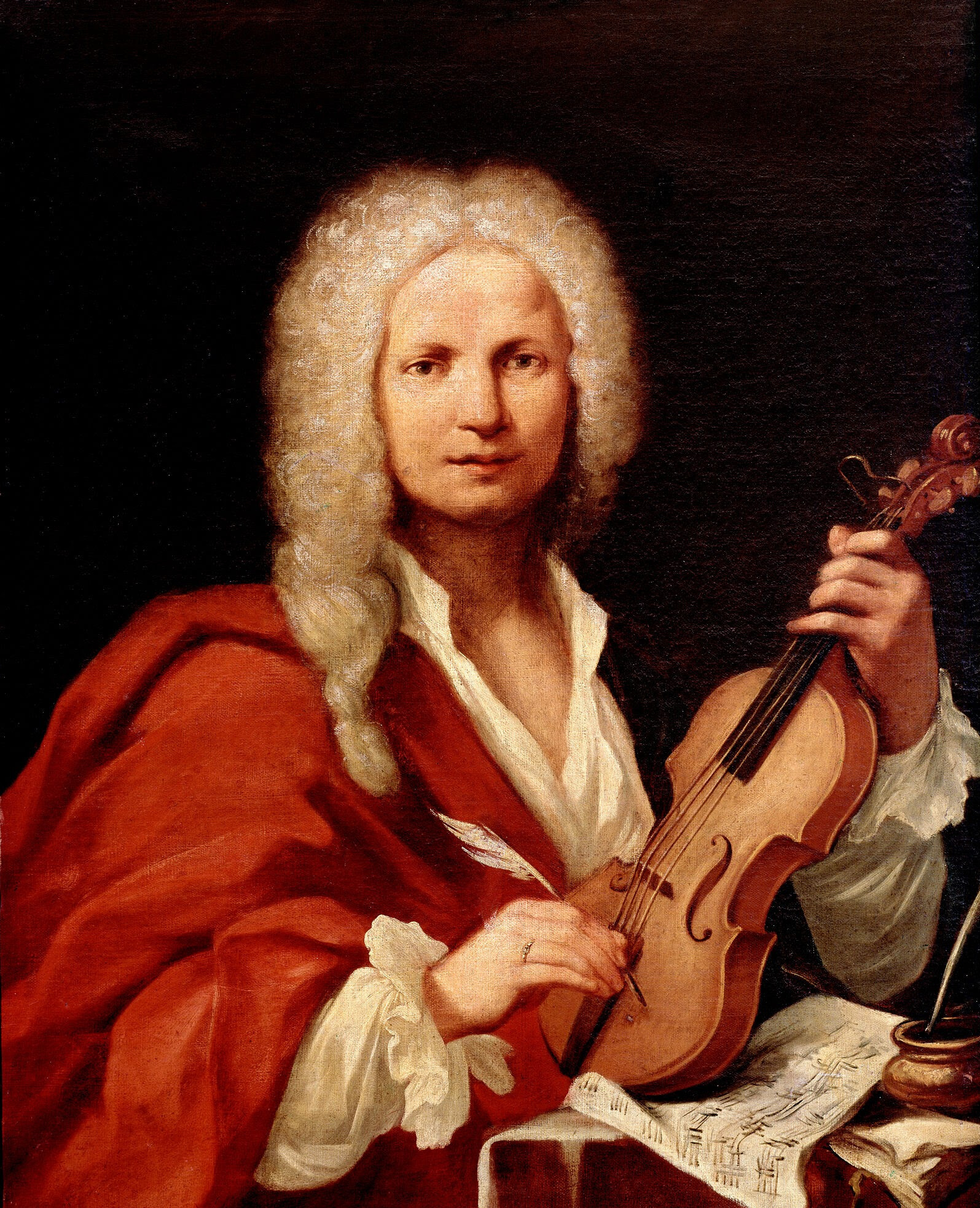
- Putative portrait of Antonio Vivaldi, c. 1723
- Librettist: Giovanni Palazzi
- Language: Italian
- Premiere: 1718; Teatro San Moisè, Venice

Armida al campo d'Egitto is an opera in three acts by Antonio Vivaldi to a libretto by Giovanni Palazzi. It was first performed during the Carnival season of 1718 at the Teatro San Moisè in Venice, then immediately repeated in the spring in Mantua, where Vivaldi served at the court of the governor Philip of Hesse-Darmstadt. Vivaldi's version is different from the more than 50 operas whose themes derive in varying degrees from the story of Rinaldo and Armida in Torquato Tasso's epic poem La Gerusalemme liberata (Jerusalem Delivered). Unlike the more than 50 operas based on the romance of Rinaldo and Armida, Vivaldi's version starts during previous events before the war against the Crusaders. Armida was revived for the Carnival season of 1738, with much of the music rewritten, and arias by Leonardo Leo added. Act II of the original version of the opera is now lost.

== Roles ==
Role	Voice type	Premiere cast
Armida, a royal princess	contralto	Antonia Merighi
Califfo, King of Egypt	bass	Annibale Imperatori
Tisaferno	contralto castrato	Francesco Braganti
Adrasto	contralto (en travesti)	Costanza Maccari
Emireno, a general	soprano castrato	Francesco Natali
Erminia, a royal princess	soprano	Chiara Orlandi
Osmira, Califfo's niece	soprano	Rosa Venturini

== Recordings ==
Complete recording with a restored version of Act II:

- Armida al campo d'Egitto (Concerto Italiano; Rinaldo Alessandrini, conductor). Label: Naïve OP30492. (2010)

The overture to Armida al campo d'Egitto can be heard on:

- Vivaldi: Opera Overtures (I Solisti Veneti; Claudio Scimone, conductor). Label: Apex 2564605372.
- Sinfonie d'opera (I Virtuosi delle Muse; Stefano Molardi, conductor). Label: Divox CDX 70501–6.

Two arias from the work, Invan la mia pietà tenta l'ingrato and Chi alla colpa fà tragitto, can be heard on:

- Vivaldi: Arie Per Basso (Lorenzo Regazzo, bass; Concerto Italiano; Rinaldo Alessandrini, conductor). Label: Naive 30415.
