= Dirk Rossmann =

German billionaire businessman

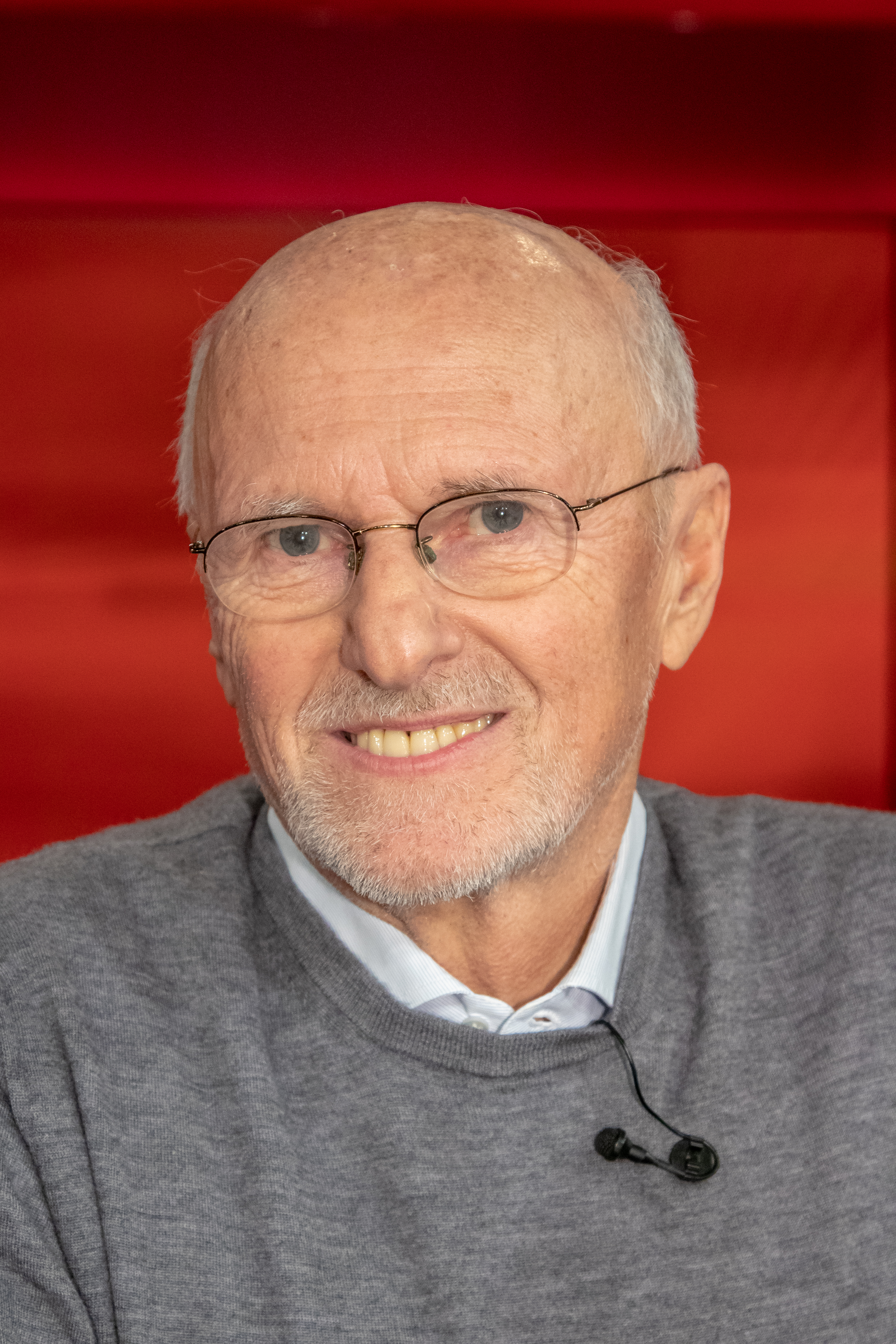
- Rossmann in 2018
- Born: 1946 or 1947 (age 78–79); Hanover, Germany
- Occupation: Businessman
- Known for: Founder, Rossmann
- Spouse: Alice Schardt-Rossmann
- Children: 2, including Raoul Rossmann

Dirk Rossmann (born 1946) is a German billionaire businessman and author, founder of Rossmann, Germany's second-largest drug store chain. As of April 2024, his net worth was estimated at US$4.5 billion.

In 1972, he established the first self-service drugstore in Germany.

== Early life ==
Rossmann grew up in Germany. His parents, Bernhard Roßmann (1910–1958) and his wife Hilde, née Wilkens, ran a small drugstore on the outskirts of Hanover in the second generation. After his father's early death, his mother sold a lot of things to save the store. "We were destitute and lived in poor conditions", Dirk Roßmann said. At the age of twelve, he earned his first money by selling pharmacy goods ten per cent cheaper. At the same age, he also learned from his mother, at his own request, that his biological father was the neighbour, Theodor Kayser (1899-1968), the son of a German manufacturer from Warsaw and the godfather of Rossmann's older brother, Axel. After finishing secondary school, he completed vocational training as a druggist. From 1962 onwards he then worked in his parents' drugstore, while his brother, who was two years older, was able to study later.

== Career ==
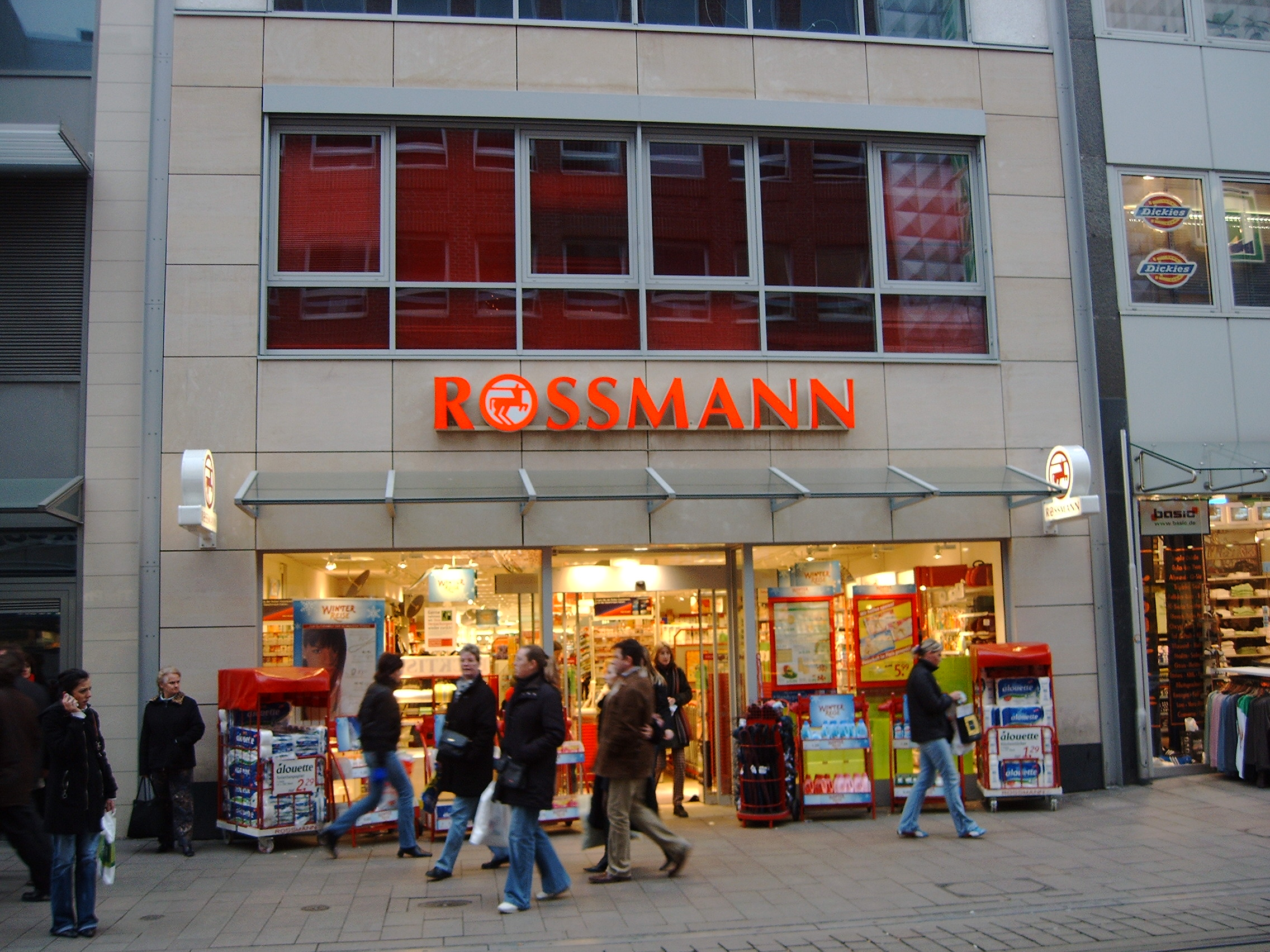
Rossmann store, Bremen, Germany

In 1972, he founded Rossmann, at the age of 25. In the 1980s, Roßmann sold 40 per cent of his company to Hannover Finanz, and its stake went to the drugstore chain of the Dutch Kruidvat Group (former owners: the De Rijcke family), which in turn was taken over in August 2004 by the A.S. Watson Group of the Hong Kong conglomerate Hutchison Whampoa.

In 2020, with 2,196 branches throughout Germany, the Rossmann company is number 2 in the German market according to DM. After the fall of the "Iron Curtain" in the early 1990s, Roßmann's company expanded into the Eastern European market, where he has operated over 1,000 shops since 2009. Europe-wide there are 4,088 shops, Germany-wide 2,196 shops (as of 2020). He now employs 33,400 people in Germany and around 56,200 people internationally. In Germany, Rossmann most recently generated a turnover of 7 billion euros (+ 5.1 per cent). Group-wide, turnover rose to 10 billion euros in 2019.

The assets of Rossmann were estimated by Forbes to be around US$2.7 billion in 2016. In November 2019, Forbes estimated his net worth at US$4.1 billion.

== Personal life ==
He is married to Alice Schardt-Rossmann, with two children, and lives in Lower Saxony, Germany. Both sons studied business administration, and work together with their father in the management of the company.

== Bibliography ==
- "... dann bin ich auf den Baum geklettert!" Von Aufstieg, Mut und Wandel (2018)
- Der neunte Arm des Oktopus (2021)
