= German Foundation for World Population =

Non-profit sexual & reproductive health organization

DSW (Deutsche Stiftung Weltbevölkerung)
- Founded: 1991
- Founder: Erhard Schreiber; Dirk Roßmann
- Purpose: International Development, Healthcare, Capacity building, Ending poverty, SRHR
- Location: Hanover, Germany
- Region served: Europe, Africa
- Method: Donations and grants
- Endowment: €8.402.240,39 (in 2021)

DSW (German: Deutsche Stiftung Weltbevölkerung) is an international private non-profit foundation addressing sexual and reproductive health (SRH) and population dynamics. DSW funds its project and advocacy work from private donations and the financial support of governments, foundations and other organisations. It has its headquarters in Hanover, Germany.

== History ==
DSW was founded in 1991 by German entrepreneurs Erhard Schreiber and Dirk Roßmann. DSW opened country offices in the 1990s in Ethiopia, Kenya, Tanzania and Uganda to provide field-based services. The organisation's goal is to strengthen the human right to family planning, especially in East Africa, and to support young people in making self-determined decisions about their sexuality and contraception. In addition, DSW contributes to political decision-making processes in the areas of health, family planning and gender equality at national as well as international level. DSW's headquarters is in Hanover withliaison offices in Berlin and Brussels. DSW also has country offices in Ethiopia, Kenya and Tanzania. In 2018, DSW ended its direct operations in Uganda, and handed over its mandate to Action 4 Health Uganda (A4HU), a local, independent organisation. A total of 167 employees currently work for DSW (as of December 2022).

== Projects ==
DSW supports numerous projects in the four East African countries of Ethiopia, Kenya, Tanzania and Uganda. These are implemented by DSW's country offices and partner organisation Action for Health Uganda (A4HU). They work closely with a network of youth empowerment centres and youth clubs. Here, young people are trained as youth counsellors in the area of sexual and reproductive health and rights (SRHR), who then in turn pass on their knowledge to their peers. Information sessions are also held in communities - often in remote areas. DSW tries to provide youth-friendly access to modern contraceptives. Special clinics have therefore been set up in Ethiopia to give young people direct access to modern contraceptives and health care. In addition, DSW-trained "flying nurses" (mobile nurses) provide family planning services directly to households in their communities. DSW also provides counselling for mothers living with HIV and offers assistance to underage workers on large industrialised farms. In addition to sexuality education and health care, the young people are supported in earning their own income through education and training, to become financially independent and to be able to live self-determined lives. Through the training of youth champions, DSW also supports young people in gaining a voice in society and politics. DSW also works intensively on behalf of young people in various multisectoral cooperation projects, for example with Hanns R. Neumann Foundation (HRNS), Siemens Foundation, Kühne Foundation and Herz Foundation. DSW's projects and programmes are funded by the EU, the German Federal Ministry for Economic Cooperation and Development (BMZ), UNFPA, the Lower Saxony Bingo Environmental Foundation, and US foundations, among others, as well as numerous private donors.

== Political work ==
In addition to the above-mentioned projects, DSW also works at the political level to raise more funds in the area of global health and sexual and reproductive health and rights and to achieve concrete improvements worldwide - such as the opening of new health facilities or simplified access to contraceptives. Therefore, DSW is in constant dialogue with political decision makers in Germany, in the EU, in the focus countries in East Africa and on an international level. DSW is an active member of numerous national and international alliances, including the Association of German Development and Humanitarian Aid NGOs (VENRO)(VENRO), the Action against AIDS Germany and the Association of German Foundations. The aim of joint activities is to raise awareness of global health issues among political decision-makers and thus increase the pressure for action.

== Parliamentary Advisory Board ==
The Parliamentary Advisory Board was founded in 2003 on the initiative of DSW by members of the German Bundestag as an informal, cross-factional and cross-committee body. DSW provides the secretariat for the Advisory Board. The Advisory Board addresses the issues of sustainable development, global health, sexual and reproductive health and rights, and gender justice. It also addresses the challenges and opportunities of population dynamics.

== Publications ==
DSW is the German partner of the United Nations Population Fund (UNFPA) and in this capacity presents the German edition of the UN's State of World Population Report each year. The DSW Data Report, also published annually, provides the latest demographic, socioeconomic and health data on population trends for all countries and regions.

== Organisation ==
DSW's Board of Directors consists of Helmut Heinen (Chairman) and Dr. Andrea Fadani. The Board is advised, supported and supervised by the Supervisory Board, which includes the following members: Elmar Bingel (Chairman), Renate Bähr (Deputy Chairman), Klaus Brill, Dr. Barbara Kloss-Quiroga, Dr. Anja Langenbucher, Sylvia von Metzler and Dirk Roßmann. To advise them, the Executive Board and the Supervisory Board jointly appoint a Board of Trustees made up of recognised public figures. The term of office is not limited. The Board of Trustees consists of Dr. Sara Seims, Prof. Dr. Klaus Töpfer and Prof. Dr. Ernst U. von Weizsäcker. The Managing Director of DSW is Jan Kreutzberg, his deputy is Angela Bähr. In 2005, DSW helped found the Alfred Biolek-Stiftung on AIDS in Africa, and continues to provide administrative support for their activities.

== Media Award ==
Since 2007, DSW has been awarding the "World Population" media prize and funding research trips to sub-Saharan Africa. The aim is to enable media professionals to publish articles on population development, global health and gender (in)justice. The prize is under the patronage of the German Federal Minister for Economic Cooperation and Development, Svenja Schulze.

== Funding ==
DSW received donations and grants totalling 7,694,731.45 Euro in fiscal year 2021, of which 2,347,108.04 Euro came from monetary donations and 456,264.16 euros from bequests. The majority of the money went to current projects and educational and awareness work (81.1 percent).

== Awards ==
The foundation has been awarded the donation seal of the Deutschen Zentralinstituts für Soziale Fragen (DZI).

== See also ==
- International Conference on Population and Development
- International Development
- Reproductive Health
- Reproductive rights
- List of population concern organizations
