= Beauty store =

Retailer selling cosmetics, hair-care products, and/or beauty tools

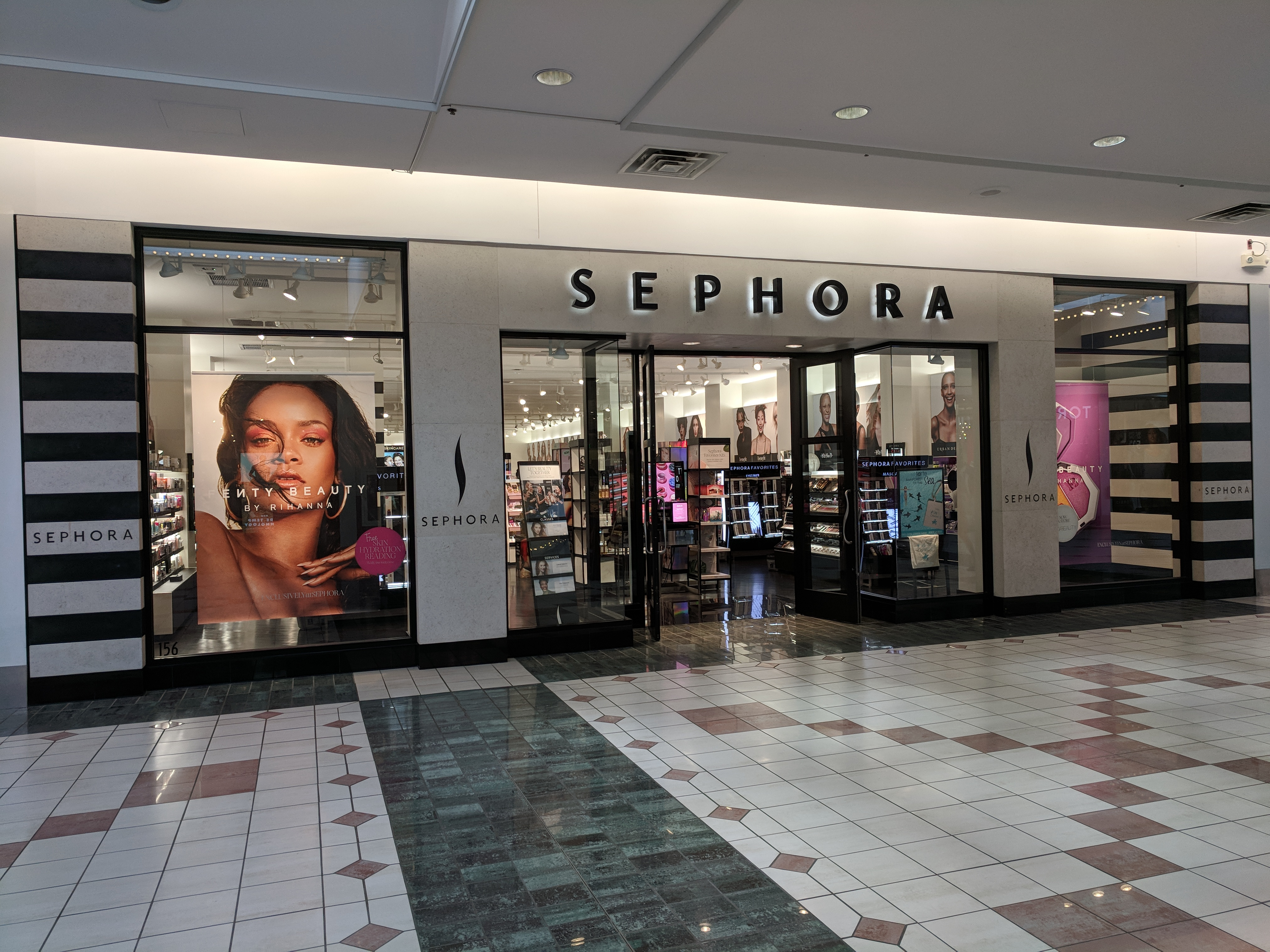
Sephora storefront in Eastview Mall, New York

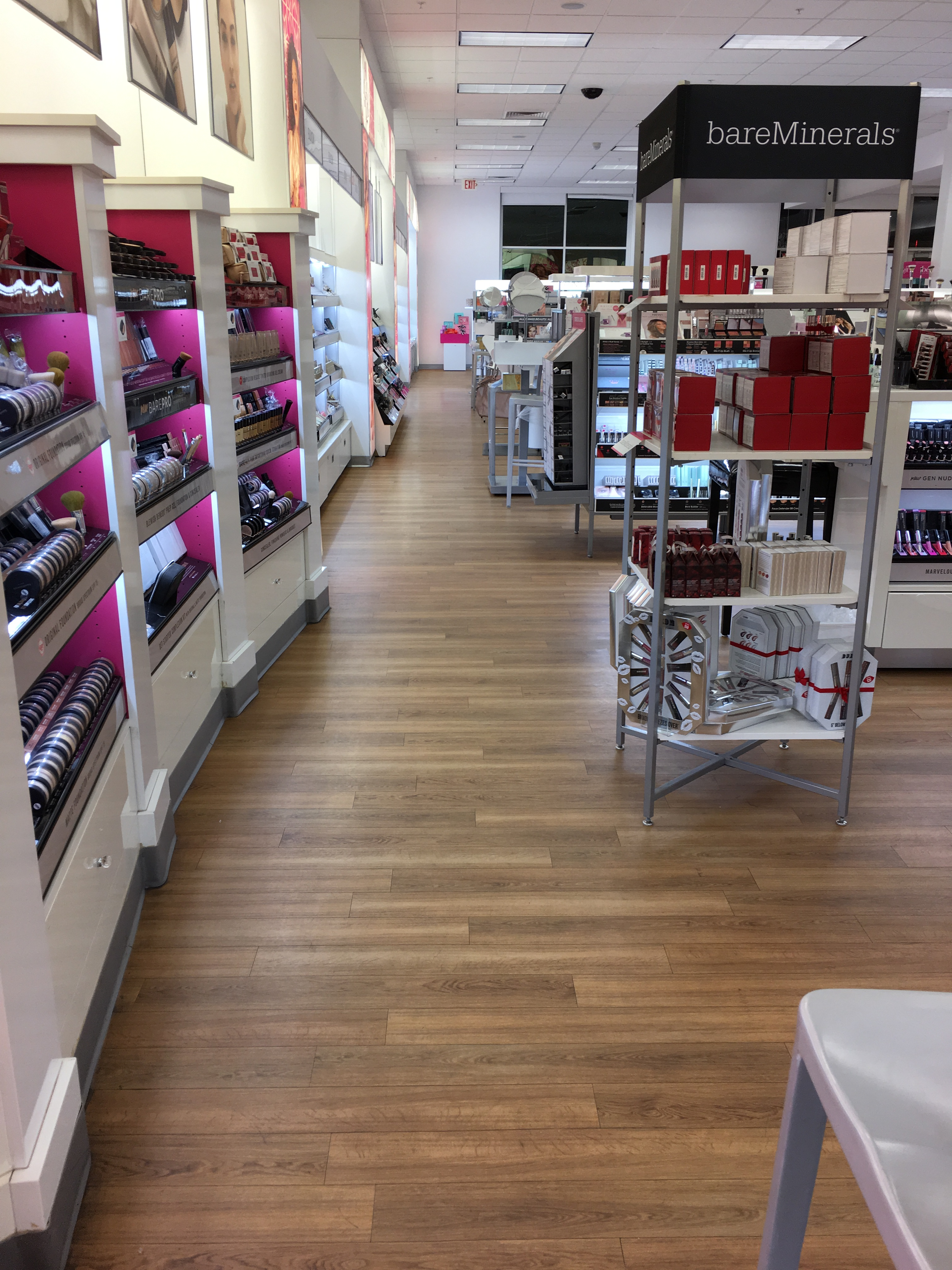
The inside of an Ulta store in the San Francisco Bay Area

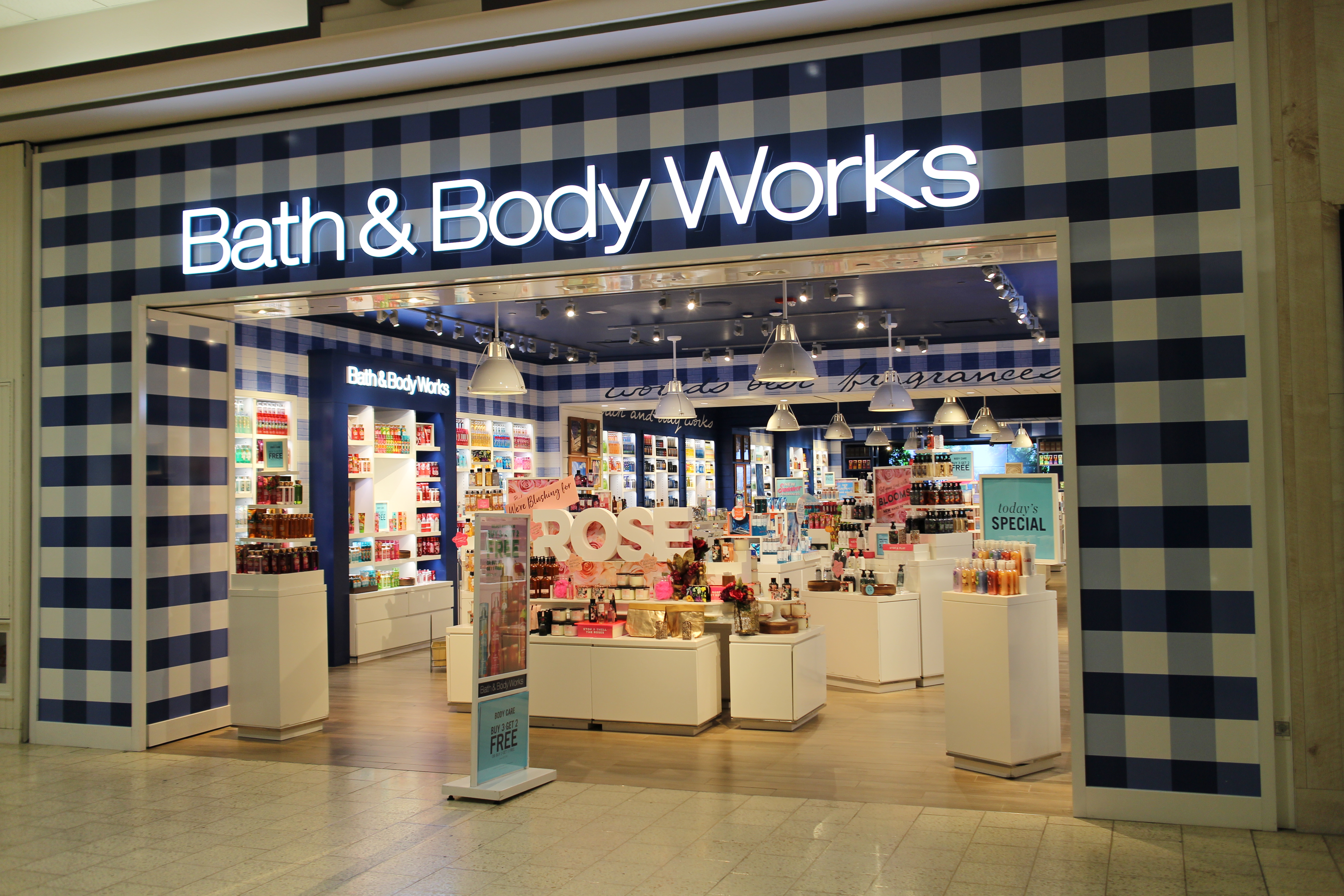
A Bath & Body Works in Rapid City, South Dakota, USA

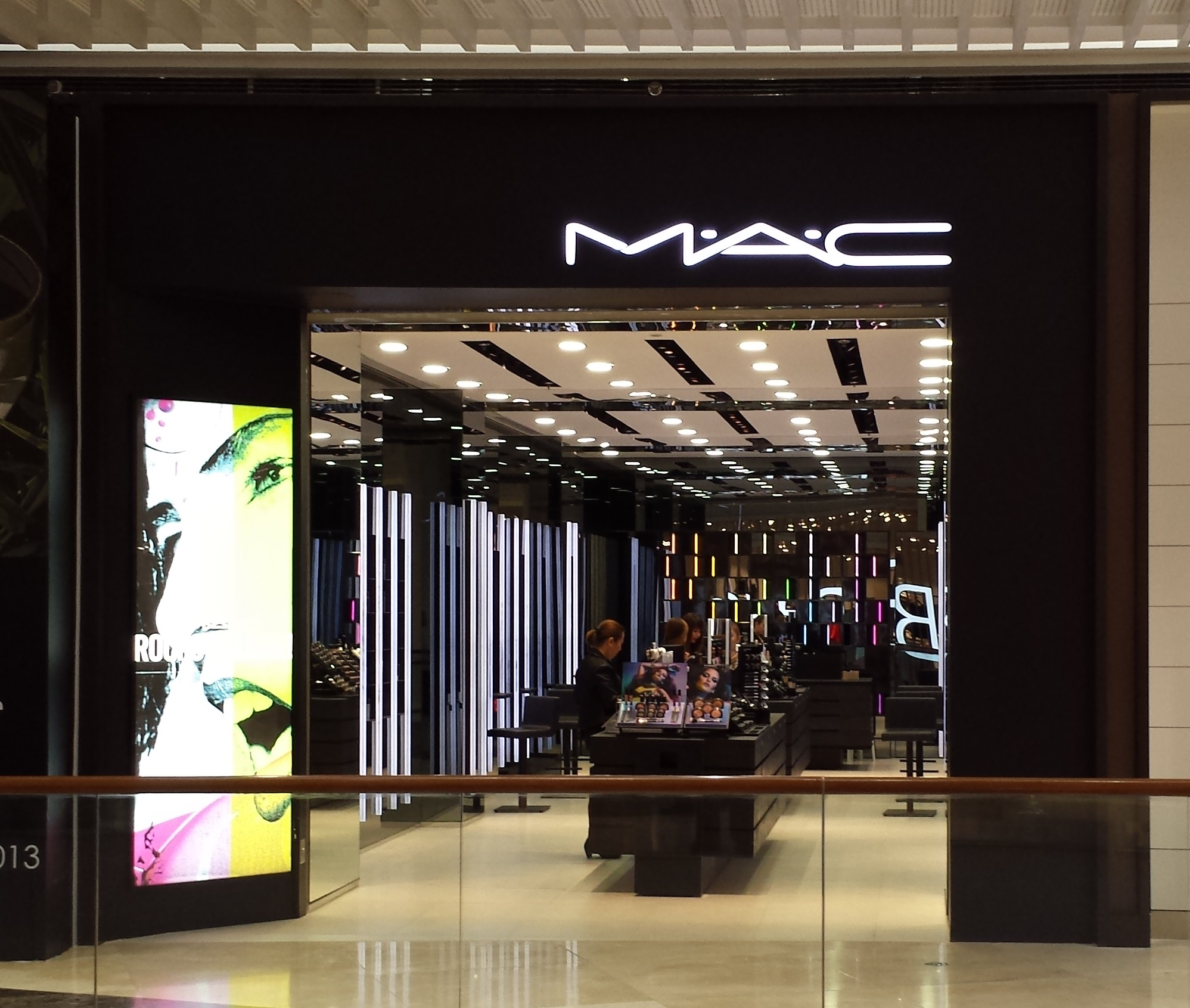
A MAC Cosmetics store in the SM Aura Premier mall in Bonifacio Global City, Metro Manila, Philippines

A beauty store, beauty supply store or cosmetics store is a retail business that sells cosmetics, hair-care products and/or beauty tools. The term "beauty store" (without "supply") is often associated with large chains that provide a large-format, glamorous shopping experience whereas "beauty supply store" (including "supply") is associated with smaller, independent retailers.

The industry collectively is referred to by various terms such as under the NAICS classification system, Cosmetics, Beauty Supplies & Perfume Stores (NAICS 446120), comprising establishments known as cosmetic or perfume stores or beauty supply shops primarily engaged in retailing cosmetics, perfumes, hair, wigs, toiletries, and personal grooming products.

== Chains ==
Chains of beauty stores include:

- Bath & Body Works
- bluemercury
- Douglas
- ICI Paris XL
- Lush
- M·A·C
- Merle Norman
- Müller
- Sally Beauty
- Sephora
- Ulta Beauty
