= Savers (UK retailer) =

UK discount chain

Savers Health and Beauty Limited
- Formerly: Sourcepole Limited (1987–1988); Savers Drug Stores Limited (1988–1990); Savers Drugstores plc (1990–1996)
- Type: Subsidiary
- Industry: Retail
- Founded: 1988
- Headquarters: Dunstable, Luton England
- Key people: Dominic Lai (Group Managing Director); Doug Winchester (Managing Director)
- Products: Health & Beauty Products
- Owner: AS Watson
- Parent: CK Hutchison Holdings
- Website: savers.co.uk

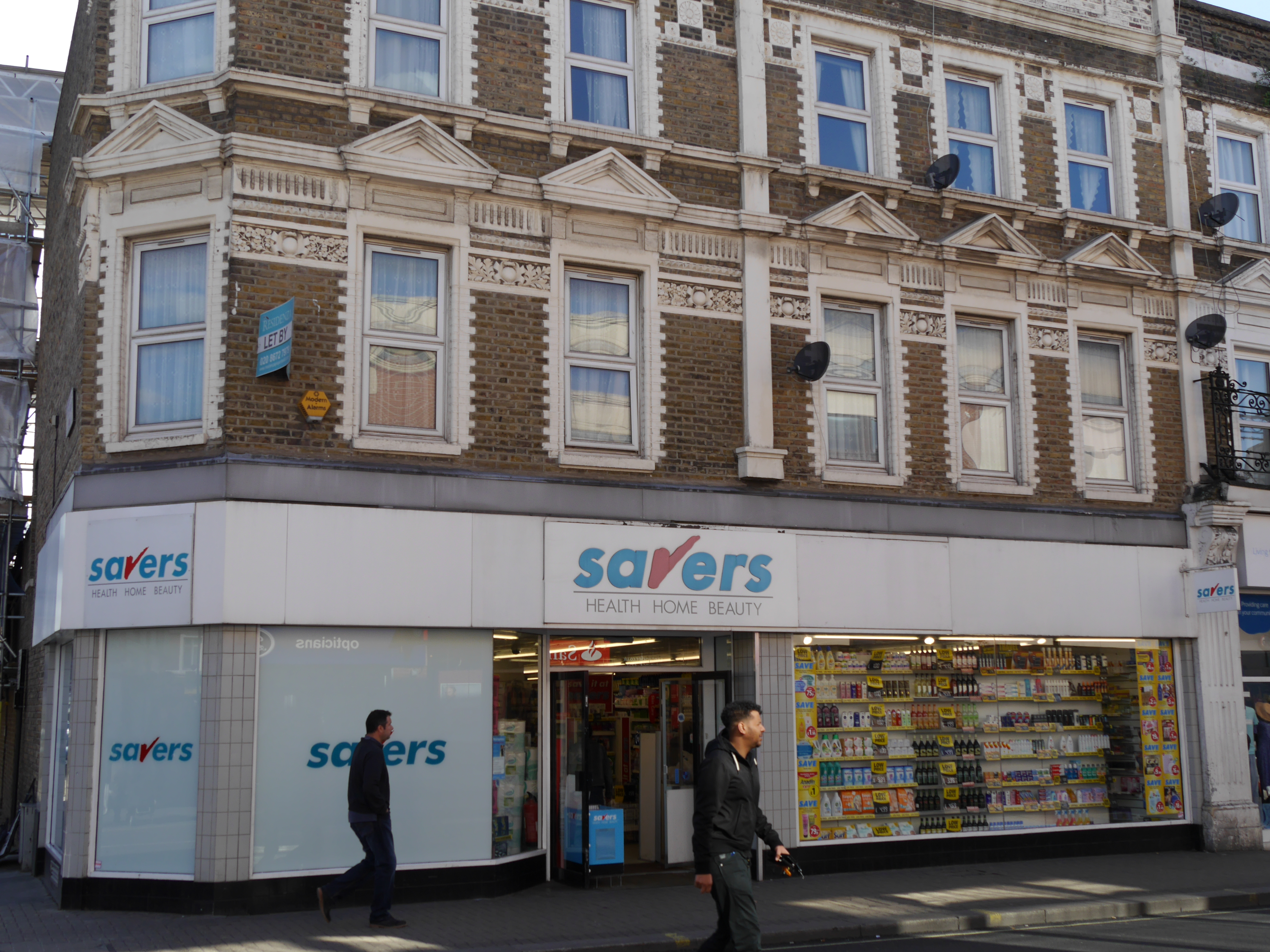
Savers, North End Road, Fulham, London (April 2015)

Savers Health and Beauty Limited, trading as Savers, is a discount chain of more than 500 stores, owned by AS Watson (Health & Beauty UK) Ltd, which is part of AS Watson. (Note: AS Watson (Health & Beauty UK) Limited was formerly known as Watson's Personal Care Stores (UK) Limited from 2000 to 2001, Watson's Personal Care Stores (UK) Holdings Limited from 2001 to 2003, and A.S. Watson (Health & Beauty UK) Limited from 2003 to 2024.) It is a value retailer selling a variety of health, beauty, household goods, medicines and fragrances.

== History ==
The company gradually expanded throughout the 1990s before acquiring the 100-strong Supersave chain of drugstores from GHEA. The company grew to 176 stores before being sold to AS Watson, the retail and manufacturing arm of CK Hutchison Holdings, a Hong Kong-based conglomerate, in July 2000.

Subsequently, AS Watson acquired Kruidvat, the owner of the chain Superdrug, in 2002. Following this, many Savers stores were converted to the Superdrug format, though some later reverted to the Savers brand.

During the COVID-19 pandemic, whilst Savers stores remained open, store footfall fell by 60% during lockdown, with the company receiving £2.3 million from the Government's coronavirus job retention scheme. Between 2022 and 2023, new stores were opened, however the number of company employees reduced, resulting in increased annual profits. By early 2025 the company had 500 stores, with plans to open over 30 more stores in the next year, with expansion focused in the south east of Britain.

The company is based in Dunstable, Bedfordshire; with the main office building doubling as one of A.S. Watson's large UK distribution centres serving Savers, Superdrug and The Perfume Shop. The company's registered office is Hutchinson House, Battersea, London.
