= Online doctor =

Profession

Online doctor is a term that emerged during the 2000s, used by both the media and academics, to describe a generation of physicians and health practitioners who deliver healthcare, including drug prescription, over the internet.

== Emergence of online doctoring ==
In the 2000s, many people came to treat the internet as a first, or at least a major, source of information and communication. Health advice is now the second-most popular topic, after pornography, that people search for on the internet. With the advent of broadband and videoconferencing, many individuals have turned to online doctors to receive online consultations and purchase prescription drugs. Use of this technology has many advantages for both the doctor and the patient, including cost savings, convenience, accessibility, and improved privacy and communication.

In the US, a 2006 study found that searching for information on prescription or over-the-counter drugs was the fifth most popular search topic, and a 2004 study found that 4% of Americans had purchased prescription medications online. A 2009 survey conducted by Geneva-based Health On the Net Foundation found one-in-ten Europeans buys medicines from websites and one-third claim to use online consultation. In Germany, approximately seven million people buy from mail-order pharmacies, and mail-order sales account for approximately 8–10% of total pharmaceutical sales. In 2008, the Royal Pharmaceutical Society of Great Britain reported that approximately two million people in Great Britain were regularly purchasing pharmaceuticals online (both with a prescription from registered online UK doctors and without prescriptions from other websites). A recent survey commissioned by Pfizer, the Medicines and Healthcare products Regulatory Agency, RPSGB, the Patients Association and HEART UK found that 15% of the British adults asked had bought a prescription-only medicine online.

In developed countries, many online doctors prescribe so-called ‘lifestyle drugs’, such as for weight loss, hair loss or erectile dysfunction. The RPSGB has identified the most popular products prescribed online as Prozac (an antidepressant), Viagra (for erectile dysfunction), Valium (a tranquilliser), Ritalin (a psychostimulant), Serostim (a synthetic growth hormone) and Provigil (a psychostimulant). A study in the USA has also shown that antibiotics are commonly available online without prescription.

== Potential harm ==
Traditionalist critics of online doctors argue that an online doctor cannot provide proper examinations or diagnosis either by email or video call. Such consultations, they argue, will always be dangerous, with the potential for serious disease to be missed. There are also concerns that the absence of proximity leads to treatment by unqualified doctors or patients using false information to secure dangerous drugs.

Proponents argue there is little difference between an e-mail consultation and the sort of telephone assessment and advice that doctors regularly make out of hours or in circumstances where doctors cannot physically examine a patient (e.g., jungle medicine).

Laurence Buckman, chairman of the British Medical Association’s GPs’ committee, says that online consultations make life easier for doctors and patients when used properly. "Many GPs will be very happy with it and it could be useful. When it’s a regular patient you know well, it follows on from telephone consulting. Voice is essential, vision is desirable. The problem comes when I don’t know the patient". Niall Dickson, chief executive of the General Medical Council, says: "We trust doctors to use their judgement to decide whether they should see a patient in person. Online consultations will be appropriate for some patients, whereas other patients will need a physical examination or may benefit from seeing their doctor in person".

== Past and future developments ==
The first medical consulting website in the US was WebMD, founded in 1996 by Jim Clark (one of the founders of Netscape) and Pavan Nigam as Healthscape. Currently, its website carries information regarding health and health care, including a symptom checklist, pharmacy information, drug information, blogs of physicians with specific topics, and a place to store personal medical information. As of February 2011, WebMD's network of sites reaches an average of 86.4 million visitors per month and is the leading health portal in the United States.

Many US healthcare and medical consulting sites have experienced dramatic growth. (Healthline, launched in 2005, grew by 269% to 2.7 million average monthly unique visitors in Q1 2007 from 0.8 million average monthly unique visitors in Q1 2006). Several American online doctor companies provide consultations with doctors over the phone or the Internet. Prominent San Francisco-based venture capital firm Founders Fund called such services "extraordinarily fast" and predicted that they will "bring relief to thousands of people with immediate medical needs".

In the UK, e-med was the first online health site to offer both a diagnosis and prescriptions to patients over the Internet. It was established in March 2000 by Dr. Julian Eden, In 2010, DrThom claimed to have 100,000 patients visit their site. NHS Direct (currently NHS Choices) is the free health advice and information service provided by the National Health Service (NHS) for residents and visitors in the UK, with advice offered 24 hours a day via telephone and web contact. Over 1.5 million patients visit the website every month. More recently, a number of online doctors have emerged in the country, firms such as Now Healthcare Group, Dr Fox Pharmacy, Push Doctor and Lloyds Pharmacy offer consultation and prescriptions via the Internet. Similar services are offered by private telemedicine providers in Europe, where online consultations may be combined with digital prescribing and dispensing through partner pharmacies.

In Australia HealthDirect is the free health advice and information service provided by the government with advice offered 24 hours a day via telephone. Medicare began funding online consultations for specialists on 1 July 2011 which has seen a slow but steady increase in volumes.

In India, Lybrate is an online healthcare platform to connect doctors and patients to get an instant solution on their mobile. This mobile technology allows a patient to connect with the doctor online through a video call, live message chat or schedule an appointment and can get instant medication info.

New advances in digital information technology mean that in future online doctors and healthcare websites may offer advanced scanning and diagnostic services over the internet. The Nuffield Council on Bioethics identifies such services as direct-to-consumer body imaging (such as CT and MRI scans) and personal genetic profiling for individual susceptibility to disease. Professor Sir Bruce Keogh, the medical director of the UK NHS, is drawing up plans to introduce electronic consultation via Skype and has said IT will "completely change the way [doctors] deliver medicine".

== See also ==
- eHealth
- e-Patient
- Health informatics
- mHealth
- Telemedicine
- Telehealth
