= E-med =

UK online medical site

e-med (e-Med Private Medical Services) is a company that formerly operated an online medical site based in the UK. It is notable for being the first web portal to offer consultation, diagnosis, referral and prescription services to remote patients via email and Skype video conferencing, and for a General Medical Council case in 2007.

In the UK, e-med (e-med Private Medical Services Ltd) was the first online health site to offer both diagnosis and prescriptions over the internet to patients. It was established in March 2000 by Dr. Julian Eden, drawing on his remote medicine experience as a doctor serving the world traveller, SCUBA and dive population (between 2002 and 2004, he was The Guardian newspaper's "Flying Doctor").

At the time, e-med's instant popularity (with six hundred patients signed up in the first month) was criticised by the medical establishment, including the BMA (British Medical Association). Dr Paul Cundy, a member of the BMA's IT committee, argued: "When it comes to online consultation or diagnosis, then I think the internet is simply not robust enough. There are no regulations to protect patients, and they are completely and utterly at the mercy of internet doctors."

In 2011, e-med had logged over one million consultations and was serving 500,000 patients worldwide annually. e-med was also the first medical practice to use Skype, a videoconferencing service, to conduct "face-to-face" consultations between doctors and patients in different locations.

The model established by e-med and other UK online consulting sites is not only being adopted in other European countries, but also by the UK's state medical service. Professor Sir Bruce Keogh, the medical director of the NHS (National Health Service), mandated the implementation of new plans that would introduce online consultations via Skype, noting that IT will "completely change the way [doctors] deliver medicine".

== Grand Rounds ==
The website publishes the open access case report journal "Grand Rounds".

== Controversy ==
In 2007, complaints were registered with the General Medical Council (GMC), the body overseeing British doctors, alleging "misprescription of dangerous drugs" by Dr. Julian Eden. Two of the complaints were made by national newspaper reporters listing false details with e-med and another by Ian van Every, a company director of Dr. Thom.com, a medical website run by his brother, Thomas van Every. As a result, Eden was removed from the medical register in 2009.
