= 50 Reasons to Hate the French =

2006 book by Jules Eden

50 Reasons to Hate the French: Vive La Difference?
- Cover of US edition
- Author: Jules Eden and Alex Clarke
- Language: English
- Genre: Humour
- Publisher: Quetzal Publishing
- Publication date: August 3, 2006
- Publication place: United Kingdom
- Media type: Print (Hardcover)
- Pages: 304 pp (first edition, hardcover)
- ISBN: 0-9553467-0-3 (UK, first edition, hardcover)
- OCLC: 70882077
- Dewey Decimal: 944.002/07 22
- LC Class: DC34 .E34 2006

50 Reasons to Hate the French: Vive La Difference? is a humorous book by Jules Eden and Alex Clarke that takes an irreverent look at French politics, food, geography, business, and history, in order to delineate just what makes France so "exceptionnel". Published in London on August 3, 2006 by Quetzal Publishing, it has since been released in the United States by Ivan R. Dee.

In the introduction the authors write,

For all the magnificence of the Louvre and the Arc de Triomphe, for all the cultural joy of Debussy and Cézanne, for all the achievements of Joan of Arc and Napoleon, there just is something fishy about the French.

The book is arranged into fifty chapters, each one examining some aspect of France from politics to sports to cuisine to history to pop music. While this is a book of jourmalistic humour, the authors substamtiate their views throughout with tables, facts and quotes.

Writing in The Literary Review of April 2006, critic Alexander Waugh described the book:

Carefully and painstakingly, Eden and Clarke haul their readers across everything concerning French life and culture, explaining exactly why the whole lot of it is rubbish. They are brilliant on French pretentiousness, citing in particular art-films by Jean-Luc Godard and the fraudulent philosophies of Sartre and Derrida; they launch savage attacks on French political corruption, pointing their sharp "J'accuse" fingers at Chirac, François Mitterrand and Édith Cresson, while their excoriations of Napoleon Bonaparte and French humour are particularly delightful".
