= Peter Goldstein =

British businessman

Peter Goldstein is a British businessman who co-founded Superdrug, the United Kingdom's second largest health and beauty retailer, in 1964 with his brother Ronald.

In 2009, his net worth was estimated to be £54 million, down from £75 million in 2008. In 2011, his net worth was estimated to be £60 million.

He supported a Leave vote in the 2016 United Kingdom European Union membership referendum.
