= Dr Thom =

Online healthcare service

DrThom is a UK-based commercial online doctor service, also operating in Ireland and Australia. It is 100% owned by LloydsPharmacy, which is in turn owned by a leading international wholesale and retail company McKesson Europe.

== Origin ==
Dr Thom was founded by Thom Van Every, a sexual health doctor at London’s Chelsea and Westminster Hospital. Van Every noticed that many of his patients were embarrassed to see a doctor about their ailments. He founded the service focusing on sexual health, then gradually added services. In 2006, Dr Thom launched the UK’s first home test for HIV, based on saliva rather than the traditional blood test.

In August 2009, Lloydspharmacy acquired a 33% stake in the business, and in March 2011 it bought the remaining 67%. At the time, Lloydspharmacy’s Managing Director, Tony Page, said, “Patients love the service - it’s a rapidly growing area of our business.” The purchase price was not disclosed.

== Services ==
The website employs doctors, who review online assessments filled out by patients. Patient feedback is collected by an independent agency, I Want Great Care.

Dr Thom provides services directly to patients through its own website, and also ‘white labels’ services. Partners past and present included Superdrug, whose online sexual health service was run by Dr Thom, and the UK's National Health Service, whose erectile dysfunction service based at the Chelsea and Westminster Hospital is run in conjunction with Dr Thom. Post sale of the business, Dr Van Every was replaced as Chief Executive of the service by Rachel Carrell in 2012. Dr Van Every stepped down and left the business in 2013.

== International expansion ==
- Ireland: DrThom launched in Ireland in August 2011 and subsequently rebranded as Lloyds Online Doctor in July 2013, in line with Celesio's brand alignment programme. In August 2013 Lloyds Online Doctor and the Irish Family Planning Association announced the launch of Ireland's first home STI testing kits.
- Australia: DrThom launched in Australia in June 2013, in association with Terry White Chemists.

== Controversy ==
Dr Thom and similar websites have been criticised for enabling access to drugs including the contraceptive pill with no way to confirm that patients are who they say they are. However, the Royal College of Obstetricians and Gynaecologists have said that for established patients, online suppliers could be safe. The Department of Health has said that doctors practising in the UK must abide by General Medical Council rules, but are ultimately responsible for their own prescribing decisions.

== See also ==
- Private healthcare in the United Kingdom
