= AS Watson =

Hong Kong retailer

AS Watson Group
- Logo used since 2023

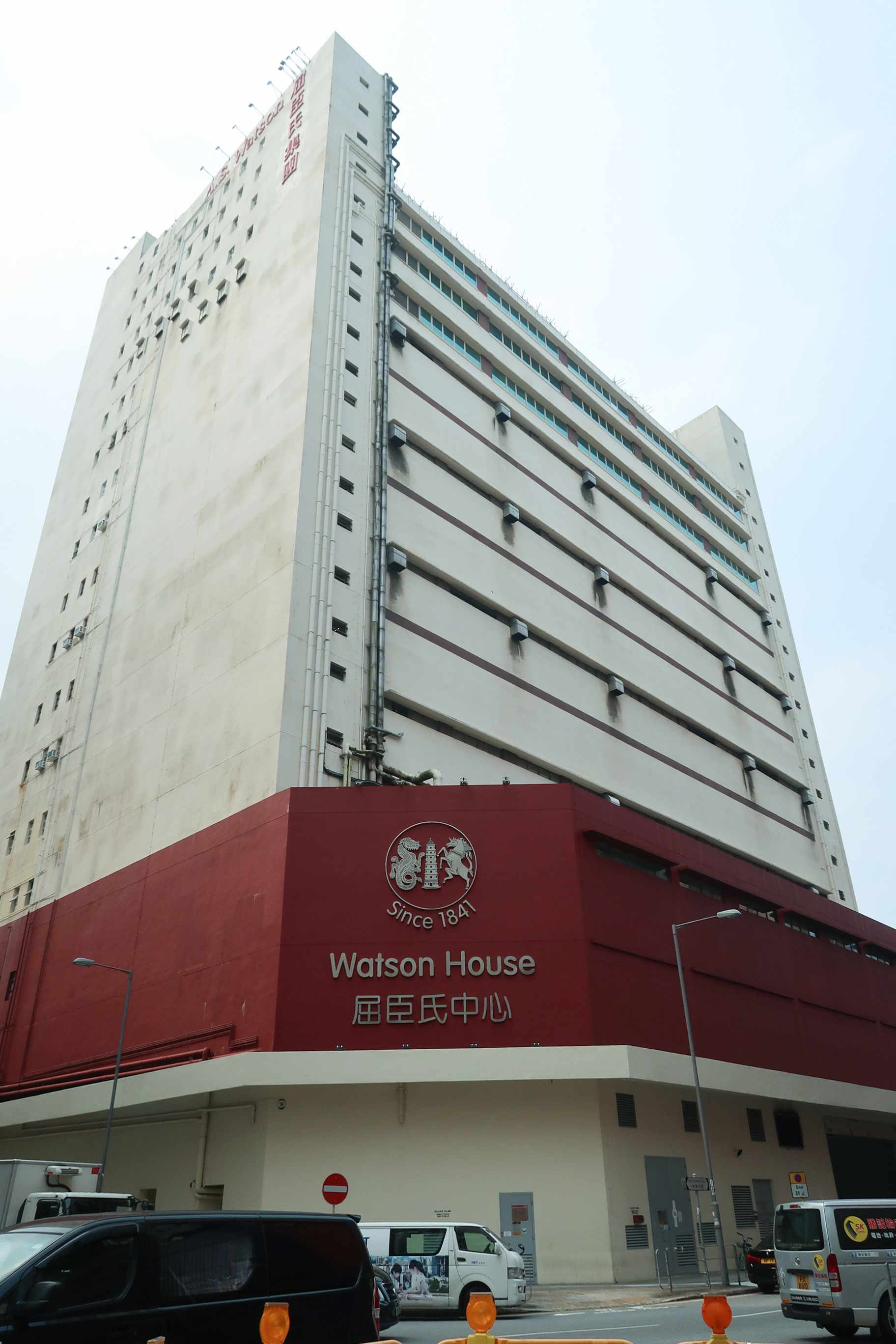
- Head office at Watson House in Fo Tan
- Type: Joint venture
- Industry: Health & beauty retail
- Founded: 1828; 198 years ago
- Headquarters: Hong Kong
- Number of locations: 16,500+ stores Worldwide
- Area served: Worldwide
- Key people: Victor Li (chairman); Dominic Lai (chairman, AS Watson Group); Malina Ngai (Group CEO, AS Watson Group)
- Products: Health, beauty & lifestyle brands
- Owners: CK Hutchison Holdings (75%); Temasek Holdings (25%)
- Number of employees: 130,000+
- Divisions: AS Watson (Health & Beauty UK) Ltd.
- Website: aswatson.com

AS Watson Group (or AS Watson or ASW) is a Hong Kong-based health and beauty retail chain noted for the world's largest international by number of stores, with over 16,500 stores in 28 markets, primarily in Asia and Europe.

A member of CK Hutchison Holdings, a Fortune Global 500 company, ASW operates the world's largest portfolio of retail formats, retail brands and has the largest geographical presence. The company is majority owned by multinational conglomerate CK Hutchison Holdings Limited, with just over 75 percent, after the remaining stake was sold to Singapore government-owned Temasek Holdings in March 2014.

== History ==
=== 1828–1999: Founding and success ===
The logo used until September 2023

AS Watson had its beginnings as the Canton Dispensary and Soda Water Establishment, founded in 1828, as a small dispensary with the mission to provide free medical services to the poor people of the Southern Chinese province of Guangdong (also known as Canton). It moved to Hong Kong and re-emerged as the Hong Kong Dispensary from 1 January 1843 under proprietors Drs. Alexander Anderson and Peter Young, trading at Capt Morgan's Bazaar. The company uses the date it moved to Hong Kong as its official date of establishment and does not describe its period in Guangzhou in its official account of its history; Richard Lord of the South China Morning Post stated that the company did this since one photograph is the only memorabilia and official document from its Guangzhou period. Dr Alexander Skirving Watson joined the company in 1858. In 1869, the Hong Kong Dispensary was appointed to dispense to the Governor of Hong Kong and the Duke of Edinburgh. The company began trading under the name A.S. Watson & Company in 1871.

By 1886, the company had constructed its first factory in Hong Kong, on Stanley Street, registered as a limited company and had also completed its first expansion further into China and to the Philippines. By 1895 the company was operating 35 stores and producing 300 dispensary, toiletry and perfumery lines.

In 1903, Watsons Water was established, selling bottled water in Hong Kong and China. In a 2018 interview, chief operating officer Malina Ngai stated that free drinking water was considered to be of poor quality at the time, and therefore the company was able to establish a market for selling drinking water.

In previous eras Watsons stores sold various kinds of general merchandise, but it became specialized in the pharmacy business as time went on.

1937 saw the Japanese invasion of China and AS Watson halted all operations in China. In 1941, AS Watson celebrated its centenary just months before the Japanese attack and the fall of Hong Kong in December that year. AS Watson eventually resumed business on 1 September 1945.

The Hutchison Group acquired a controlling interest in A.S. Watson & Co. Ltd. in 1963.

1972 saw AS Watson acquire the ParknShop supermarkets from Y.K Lau, then in 1973 acquired Peter Pan Toy Shops and launched Mountain Cream, Ice cream products.

1981 saw Hutchison Whampoa Limited take full control of AS Watson becoming a wholly owned subsidiary. According to Ngai, the ownership gave Watsons the finances needed to expand its operations.

At the end of the 1980s, the company grew rapidly by entering Taiwan in 1987, Macau and Singapore in 1988, and re-opening in China in 1989, all under the name Watsons' The Chemist.

In 1990, Hutchison Whampoa merged Fortress, which it acquired in 1986, into the Watsons Group. 1994 saw the company open a new water factory in Beijing and further expand Watsons The Chemist to Malaysia, by 1996 Watsons The Chemist had entered Thailand and in 1997 AS Watson Group had acquired Shanghai Sparkling Drinking Water. 1998 saw Fortress open its first store in Taiwan and Watson's Wine opened in Hong Kong. 1998 also saw Nuance-Watson's retail stores open at Hong Kong International Airport. AS Watson's water operations also expanded in 1998, but this time into Europe, through acquisitions. In 1999 AS Watson sold Mountain Cream, its ice cream businesses, which operated in Shanghai, Hong Kong, Guangzhou and southern China to the Unilever Group. At the time, Mountain Cream distributed Dreyer's in Hong Kong and China, and was the largest ice cream importer in Hong Kong.

=== 2000–present: International expansion ===
In 2000, AS Watson entered the United Kingdom with the acquisition of Savers Health & Beauty and in 2001 expanded its wine business with the acquisition of Badaracco SA.

The year 2002 saw AS Watson expand into Europe and the UK even further with the acquisition of the Kruidvat Group, adding a number of different brands to its portfolio, including Superdrug in the UK and ICI Paris XL and Kruidvat itself in mainland Europe.

During 2003, AS Watson signed an agreement to sell its European water operations to Nestlé, Superdrug opened its first new identity store in the Bullring Shopping Centre in Birmingham, in the UK. There were new store openings for Watsons as the company launched its third-generation store, Watsons Water celebrated its centennial anniversary and launched its "Year of Hong Kong Creativity". Fortress launched a new identity in Hong Kong and Nuance-Watson opened duty-free stores at Hong Kong International Airport.

Drogas Health and Beauty Retail Chain was acquired by AS Watson in 2004, taking the group into the Baltics, Watsons also acquired Apex Pharmacy Sdn Bhd in Malaysia. The Group purchased a 40% stake in Germany's Rossmann, adding 786 stores to the group's portfolio. TASTE food galleria launched in November 2004 and Watson's Wine launched a new concept store in Hong Kong.

In 2005 the group opened its 100th store in mainland China and its 300th store in Taiwan. The group entered Turkey with the acquisition of Cosmo Shop and the first Watsons Health and Beauty Store opened in Korea. 2005 also saw two major acquisitions in Europe with Marionnaud and The Perfume Shop. October 2005 saw the acquisition of Spektr, launching AS Watson in the Russian Market.

2006 saw Watsons open in Indonesia and it also celebrated its 200th store opening in June. AS Watson entered Ukraine through the acquisition of DC, and Marionnaud expanded into Asia with its first store opening in the Philippines in September.

Rossmann celebrated its 2,000th store milestone in 2009, while Watsons opened its 500th store in mainland China. COOL bottled water was revamped and re-branded to refresh its image.

During 2010, Watsons card membership reached the 15 million mark.

2011 saw DC Ukraine re-branded as Watsons, and Watsons China opened its 1,000th store.

On 7 October 2023, the group launched a new brand identity, featuring a modernised visual identity. Emphasising the groups heritage and trust, injecting more energy into the brand.

== Temasek Holdings stake purchase and proposed share sale ==
In March 2014, Hutchison Whampoa sold an almost 25 per cent stake in AS Watson to Temasek Holdings, for HK$44 billion.

The proposed share sale of AS Watson Group has been put in hold, announced towards the end of 2013 with the appointment of three underwriting banks, Bank of America Merrill Lynch, Goldman Sachs and HSBC. This had followed the aborted sale of Park'n'Shop, when no satisfactory offer was received for the business. The flotation of the group would take place 'in two or three years' in Hong Kong and Singapore, said Li Ka-shing at the time, rather than in Hong Kong and London as had been expected.

== AS Watson Group brands ==
=== Health and Beauty ===
- Drogas
- Kruidvat
- Trekpleister
- Rossmann
- Savers
- Superdrug
- Watsons

=== Luxury Perfumeries and Cosmetics ===
- ICI PARIS XL
- Marionnaud
- The Perfume Shop (AS Watson (Health & Beauty UK) Ltd)

=== Food, Electronics and Wine ===
- PARKnSHOP
- Taste
- FUSION
- GREAT FOOD HALL
- food le parc
- Gourmet
- International by PARKnSHOP
- FORTRESS
- Watson's Wine
- PARKnSHOP Yonghui

=== Beverages ===
- Sunkist
- Mr. Juicy
- Watsons Water
