= ICI Paris XL =

Belgian multinational perfume shop chain

ICI PARIS XL
- Type: Subsidiary of A.S. Watson Group
- Industry: Retail
- Headquarters: Belgium
- Number of locations: Belgium, Netherlands and Luxembourg
- Key people: Dominic Lai (Group Managing Director)
- Products: Perfume
- Owner: A.S. Watson Group
- Parent: Hutchinson Whampoa
- Website: www.iciparisxl.be

ICI PARIS XL is a beauty chain founded in the late 1960s in Belgium. The name ICI PARIS XL means 'This is Paris' -- which happens to be the same slogan that the Paris Saint-Germain football club uses -- and was derived from the train trips that were undertaken by the founders on their way to buy perfume from Paris. The XL refers to the location of the company's first store, which was located in Ixelles (pronounced XL), a neighbourhood of Brussels.

The Company was acquired by the Kruidvat Group in 1996, which then in-turn became part of the A.S. Watson Group in 2002.

After the acquisition by the A.S. Watson Group, the company grew rapidly through opening new stores, enlarging, refurbishing and relocating existing outlets. The company has 230 outlets in Belgium, the Netherlands and Luxembourg.
