= Watson's Wine =

Watson's Wine 屈臣氏酒窖
- Type: Privately owned company
- Industry: Wine retailing
- Founded: 1998
- Headquarters: Hong Kong
- Area served: Hong Kong
- Key people: Mr. Li Ka-shing; Mr. Canning Fok
- Products: Fine wine
- Parent: AS Watson

Watson's Wine is a Hong Kong-based wine retail chain owned by the A.S. Watson Group, a subsidiary of CK Hutchison Holdings. Established in 1998, the retailer operates specialist wine shops and an online store, offering wines, spirits and related accessories.

All staff in the stores are required to pass the "Wine & Spirit Education Trust" courses.
