= Jules Eden =

British former general practitioner and founder of e-med

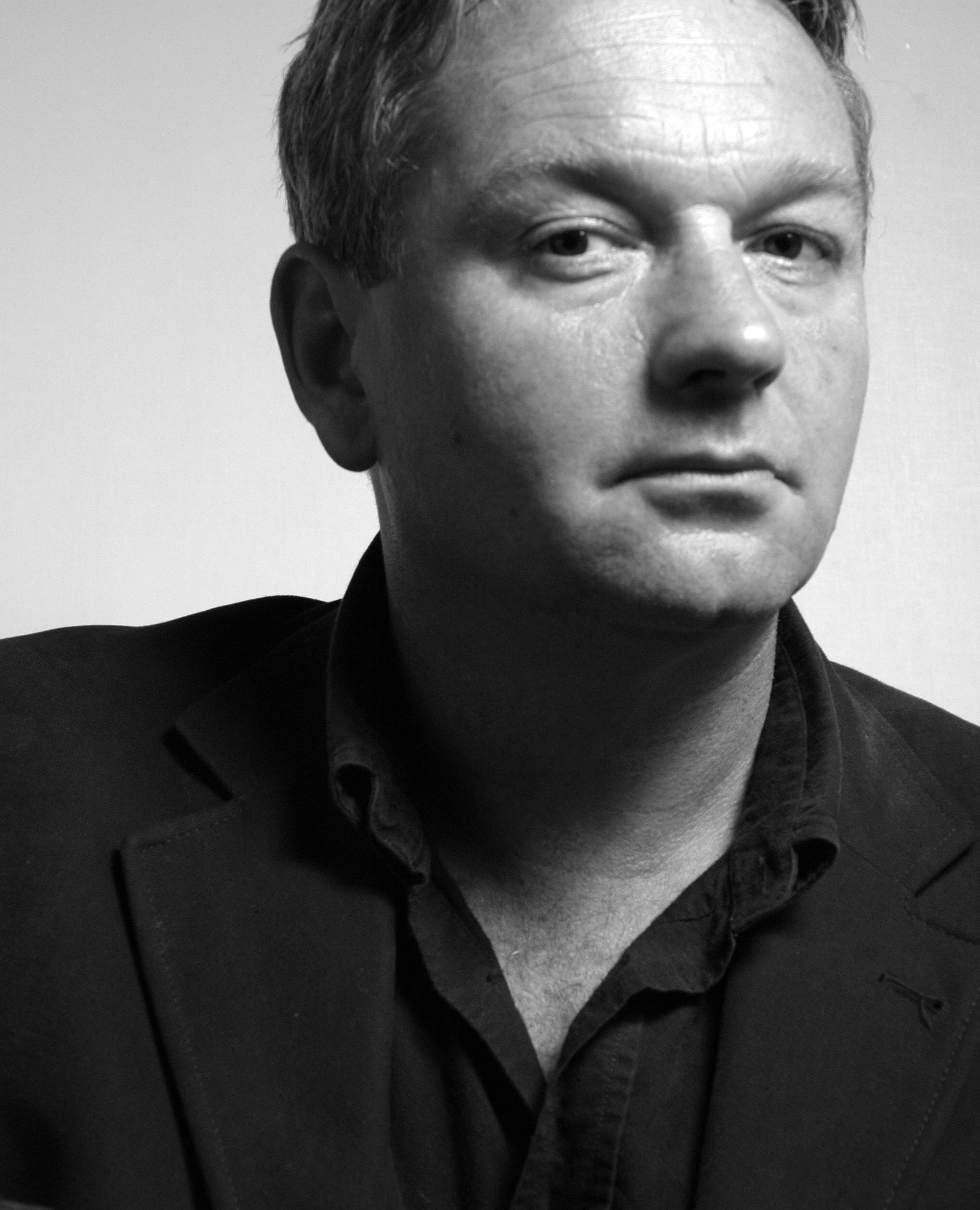
- Born: 1962 (age 63–64)
- Occupations: Businessman, author and former general practitioner
- Known for: Founding e-med

Julian "Jules" Eden (born 1962) is a British businessman, author and former general practitioner. He founded e-med, described by contemporary sources as the first British medical service to offer both diagnosis and prescriptions over the internet. The General Medical Council (GMC) suspended him for nine months in 2007 after finding that he had prescribed irresponsibly or had failed to act in patients' best interests. He was removed from the medical register in 2009.

== Early career ==
Eden worked as an NHS general practitioner before leaving that position in 1999. While working with homeless people at The Passage in London, he developed a basic first-aid pack intended to help people living on the streets treat minor injuries.

== e-med ==
Eden established e-med in 2000. The service conducted consultations by email and offered diagnosis, prescriptions and referrals. Its approach attracted criticism from the British Medical Association, whose representatives warned that diagnosing patients without physical examinations could compromise standards of care.

In 2004, The Independent on Sunday reported that the GMC had opened two inquiries involving Eden and websites for which he supplied prescriptions.

== GMC proceedings ==
At a GMC hearing in 2007, Eden faced allegations concerning three patients and two journalists who had applied for prescriptions through websites using his services. The panel found that he had acted irresponsibly, or not in the patients' best interests, in several cases. The cases included repeat prescribing to patients who became dependent on sedatives or painkillers and the prescribing of propranolol to a 16-year-old who had disclosed a history of self-harm, suicidal thoughts and psychiatric treatment.

The GMC suspended Eden from practising medicine for nine months. The panel stated that the issue was not the use of new technology itself, but the need to apply established prescribing safeguards to online consultations. Eden was struck off the medical register in 2009.

== Later online-health activity ==
In 2018, a BBC Panorama investigation examined online services that supplied prescription medicines to British patients using doctors contracted through companies outside England. The Independent reported that EuroRX, one of the companies examined, had been established by Eden. The investigation found that people using false medical histories could obtain medicines after limited online checks. Eden told the programme that he respected the Care Quality Commission and had not sought to evade its oversight; he described his EuroRX shareholding as an investment in markets subject to their own regulators.

Companies House continues to list Eden as a director and person with significant control of E-Med Private Medical Services Ltd.

== Writing and diving ==
Eden answered readers' travel-health questions for The Independent on Sunday and wrote travel-health articles for The Guardian.

With Alex Clarke, he wrote the 2006 humour book 50 Reasons to Hate the French. He later co-authored FAQ Dive Medicine with Oliver Firth. Eden has also been involved in diving medicine; an account of litigation arising from the 2007 GMC case described diving medicine as the original focus of e-med before it developed into a general-practice service.
