= Superdrug =

Health and beauty retailer in the United Kingdom

Superdrug Stores plc
- Type: Subsidiary
- Industry: Retail
- Founded: 28 May 1964; 62 years ago
- Founders: Ronald Goldstein; Peter Goldstein
- Headquarters: Croydon, England
- Number of locations: 796 (as of December 2017)
- Key people: Peter MacNab (Managing director & CEO Health & Beauty UK); Simon Comins (COO)
- Products: B. Skincare & Make-Up; Optimum High Tech Skincare; Solait Suncare & Bronzing; Studio London
- Services: Prescriptions; Health checks; Threading; Laser hair removal; Piercing
- Revenue: ▲£1.6 billion (2024)
- Net income: ▲ Pre-tax profit of £136.8m (2024)
- Owner: A.S. Watson Group
- Parent: CK Hutchison Holdings
- Subsidiaries: Superdrug On-Line Doctor; Superdrug Opticians; Superdrug Mobile (Joint venture with Three UK); Beauty; Studio by Superdrug
- Website: superdrug.com

Superdrug Stores plc (trading as Superdrug) is a health and beauty retailer in the United Kingdom, and the second largest behind Boots UK. The company is owned by AS Watson (Health & Beauty UK) Limited (Note: AS Watson (Health & Beauty UK) Limited was formerly known as Watson's Personal Care Stores (UK) Limited from 2000 to 2001, Watson's Personal Care Stores (UK) Holdings Limited from 2001 to 2003, and A.S. Watson (Health & Beauty UK) Limited from 2003 to 2024.) which is part of the A.S. Watson Group. It was acquired as part of the buyout of Kruidvat BV in October 2002. The A.S Watson Group is itself part of the Hong Kong conglomerate CK Hutchison Holdings.

Superdrug trades from nearly nine hundred shops across the United Kingdom and Ireland, and also serves Denmark, Finland and Sweden online. The company employs over 14,000. Besides offering health and beauty products online and in shops, there are pharmacies with consultation rooms in over 220 shops, and a further 19 contain nurse clinics. It maintains links with sister companies also owned by A.S. Watson Group: Savers and The Perfume Shop.

== History ==
=== Origins and expansion ===
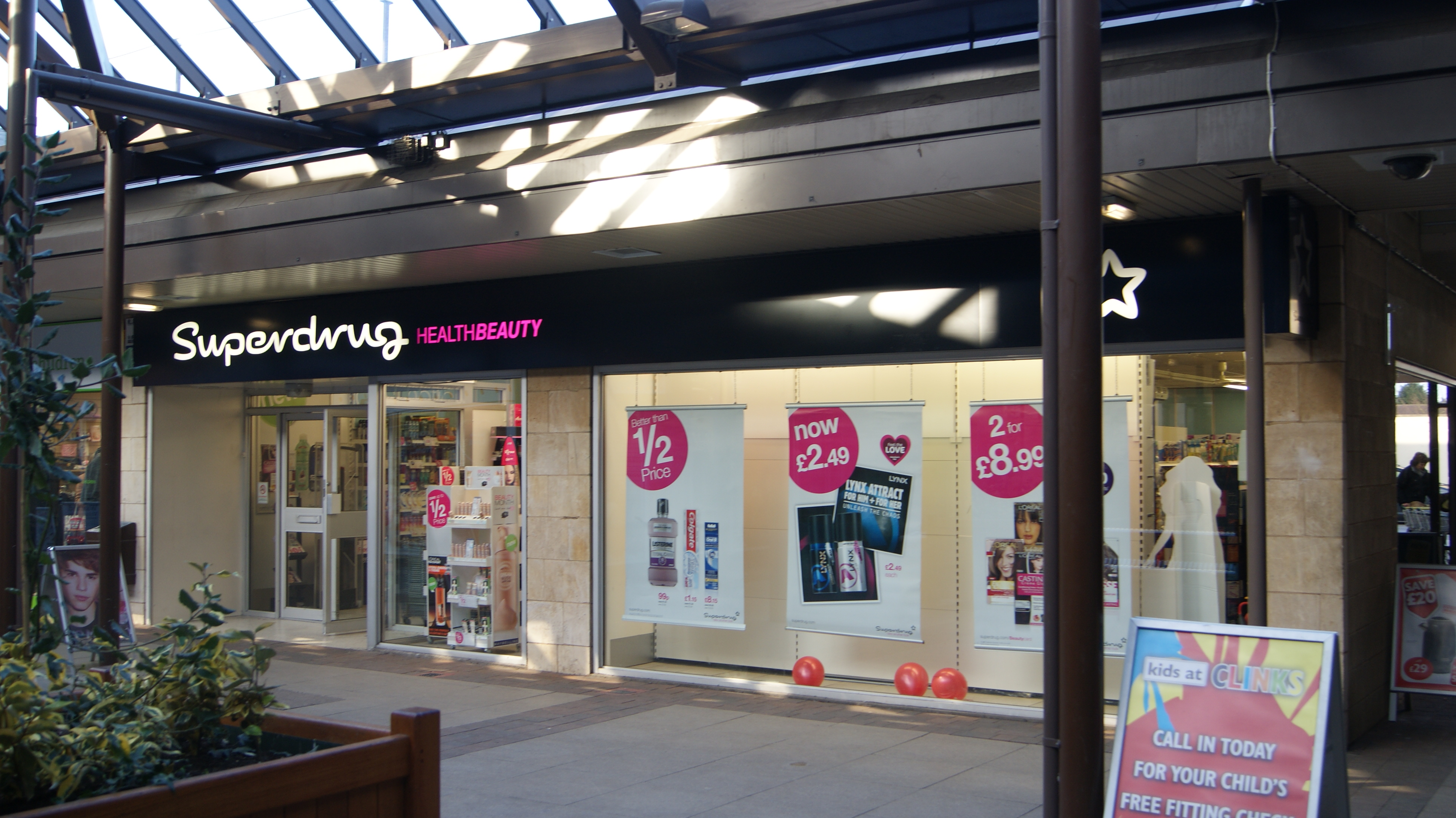
Superdrug in the Horsefair Centre, Wetherby, West Yorkshire (2012)

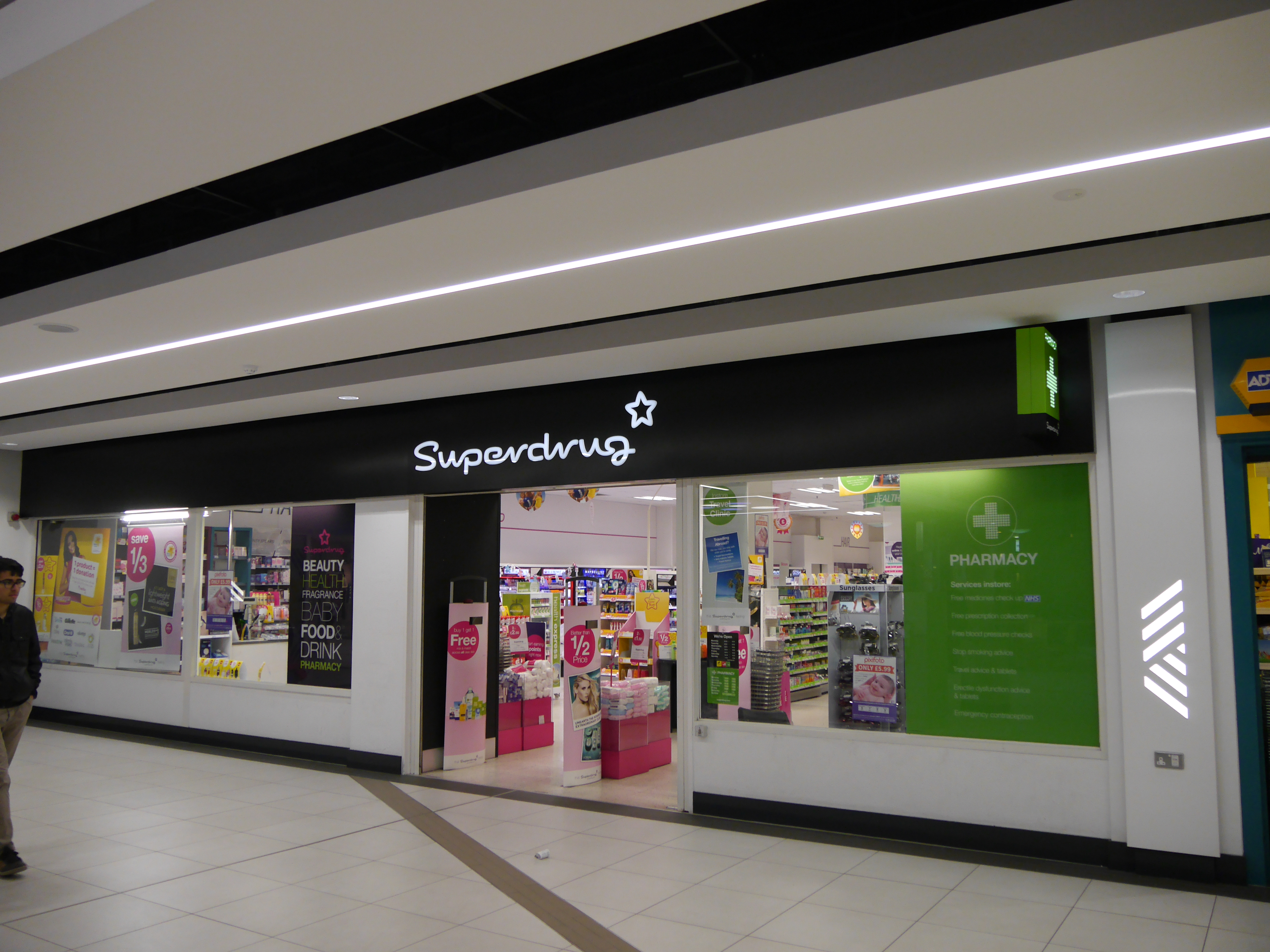
Superdrug, Kings Mall, Hammersmith, London (2016)

In 1964, Superdrug was incorporated under the name Leading Supermarkets Limited by the Goldstein brothers in London, both of whom had experience working in the groceries retail industry. Later that year the business adopted the present name. The first Superdrug shop opened in Putney, London on 26 April 1966.

By 1968, there were three shops trading in Putney, Croydon and Streatham. In the same year Superdrug acquired its first distribution centre, in Wimbledon. The chain grew rapidly, and expanded to a chain of forty shops by the beginning of the 1970s. In 1971, The Rite Aid Corporation, an American chemist chain, acquired 49% of the business.

By 1981, there were one hundred Superdrug shops in the United Kingdom, and they opened a 11,148 m^{2} (120,000 ft^{2}) distribution centre. In 1983, the business was floated on London's Unlisted Securities Market. In March 1987, Superdrug was sold to Woolworth Holdings (now known as Kingfisher plc) for £57 million.

In January 1988, Superdrug acquired Tip-Top, a discount chemist chain which had a large presence in the north of England and Scotland, and Share Drug Stores plc, a southern-based chain. These acquisitions and an aggressive expansion programme saw the chain grow to over six hundred outlets throughout the United Kingdom.

Superdrug continued to grow over the next eight years, increasing profitability and market share. The Goldstein brothers would retire from the company by 1990, shortly after its 25th anniversary In 1989, with Alan Smith heading up day-to-day operations shortly thereafter. In 1995, the company began a rebranding programme.

Superdrug decided to relocate their head office in 2017, having spent more than 40 years at Beddington Lane. The company relocated to a more central location in Croydon having declared their love for the town, securing their future in the town, with a bigger and more modern head office to develop the future of the business.

=== Acquisition ===
Facing increasing pressure from supermarkets and new discount chains, and following Kingfisher's failed merger attempt with Asda (which resulted in Walmart acquiring the latter chain), in July 2001, Superdrug was sold to Kruidvat, a chemist operator from continental Europe. It was restructured as a public limited company on 24 July, becoming Superdrug Stores plc, and in 2002 Kruidvat was sold to A.S. Watson, the retail and manufacturing business of the Hong Kong conglomerate CK Hutchison Holdings, formally Hutchison Whampoa, in November 2002. A.S. Watson is also the parent company of health and beauty retailer Savers which they acquired in 2000.

In April 2006, Superdrug entered the Irish market, and in Britain began rolling out its "next generation" shops, the first of which opened in Uxbridge. These focused on cosmetics and fragrance above all else and used plasma screens throughout the shop. Superdrug announced their intention to create 150 more next generation shops in 2008.

=== Since 2010 ===
In February 2010, Superdrug became a Cruelty Free International approved retailer, joining several other high street chains in pledging its own brand products will be free from animal testing.

During 2010, Superdrug went into partnership with sister company The Perfume Shop by trialling shop-in-shop concessions. The partnership was tried in eleven shops of Superdrug, including; Aylesbury, Milton Keynes, Bury, Glasgow, Westfield London and Kensington High Street. In January 2018, Superdrug were recognised by the Institute of Customer Service, coming fourth in the United Kingdom for Customer Satisfaction (UKCSI), with Yorkshire Bank in third, First Direct second, and Amazon first.

In September 2015, Superdrug announced the launch of a new app for customers to track their Superdrug Loyalty Points. This app eventually became the Superdrug Shopping App, which allows customers to order retail items from Superdrug branches online.

In May 2017, Superdrug relaunched their own brand "B. Makeup", and in September 2017 made history when they announced British model Georgie Aldous as their first male model in a make-up campaign.

On 22 March 2018, Superdrug opened their first vegan only pop-up shop at Shoreditch’s Boxpark. Superdrug said it was in response to increased demand for plant-based and cruelty-free beauty products. The shop showcases Superdrug's own brand beauty and cosmetic products, and also exclusive branded products that are friendly to vegans.

In August 2018, Superdrug was the subject of a blackmail attempt using data obtained from its website via credential stuffing.

Superdrug lost a court case in December 2019 resulting from words in an email issued by the company's buyer, "Please go ahead with the below", referring to supplier Athena Brand's proposals to supply a minimum quantity of Nature's Alchemist products. The words were interpreted as creating a contract between the two parties, and by inference appeared to mean that the buyer had authority to enter into such a contract.

In April 2020, it was announced that Superdrug was rolling out a new Pharmacy app to its stores across the UK, in partnership with Healthera. The app allows Superdrug patients to order prescriptions and book services online.

Since 2021, the company sponsors the UK-wide medicine packet recycling programme under which used medicine blister packets can be handed in at 195 Superdrug branches (those with in-store pharmacies), for processing by TerraCycle.

== Products and services ==
In February 2012, Superdrug went into partnership with Pro Skin Clinics, which enabled Superdrug to offer specialist skincare clinics in their shops. Treatments on offer range from laser hair removal to facials. Superdrug planned to have fifty clinics by the end of 2013, starting with shops on Kensington High Street and Oxford Street, and then concentrating on recently refurbished shops.

In February 2013, Superdrug entered the premium skincare market with a new and exclusive brand called "B". The brand is cruelty free and vegan, and offers skincare and makeup products.

In December 2007, Superdrug withdrew a women's punch bag following complaints from anti domestic violence campaigners. The man-shaped product encouraged women to insert a photo of a male in the punch bag's face and had an arrow pointing at the groin stating "kick him here". The ManKind Initiative, a domestic violence charity, said it was disgraceful that a national retailer like Superdrug should be openly selling products encouraging domestic violence against men. Following the complaints, the retailer withdrew the product and promised to donate any profits from sales of the item to the charity.

Superdrug became the first high street retailer in the United Kingdom to offer chickenpox vaccination in 58 of its shops, at a cost of £65 per dose, two doses being required, in July 2017.

=== Superdrug Mobile ===
Superdrug Mobile is a mobile virtual network operator launched in 2018 which operates in the United Kingdom using the Three network (which until 2026 was also owned by Superdrug's parent, CK Hutchison). The network is exclusive to members of Superdrug's "Health & Beautycard" loyalty scheme.

=== Superdrug Online Doctor ===
Superdrug Online Doctor launched in 2013 and is provided by Zava (Health Bridge Ltd). The service provides testing and treatment for over 75 health conditions including erectile dysfunction, contraceptive pills and weight loss. In 2026, Superdrug became the first high street retailer to provide DoxyPEP, a treatment designed to reduce the risk of certain bacterial sexually transmitted infections.

== Marketing ==
=== Advertising ===
On 1 October 2010, the campaign Take Another Look was launched by Superdrug to encourage customers to "Take Another Look" at the company, which featured Gavin & Stacey star Joanna Page who was also brand ambassador.

On 7 February 2013, Superdrug launched a new marketing and advertising campaign, "That Superdrug Feeling", featuring staff from their shops.

=== Dare Magazine ===
Superdrug's Dare Magazine underwent a major makeover, to bring it in line with the company's "Take Another Look" campaign. The Magazine is distributed in-shop and on the streets of London for free. On 10 February 2011, Superdrug announced that the magazine would be the first customer magazine to use digital watermarking technology. Readers will be able to use their smartphone to view interactive video content, and access exclusive news and tips by scanning digital watermarks embedded in the magazine.

=== Loyalty card ===
On 11 May 2011, Superdrug launched their first reward card called The Beautycard. The card was launched as part of the Take Another Look campaign, which has been at the heart of the company's marketing strategy since October 2010. On 27 May 2011, Superdrug announced they had signed up one million customers to the scheme.

In 2015, Superdrug adapted their loyalty card in order to appeal to more of a mass market, renaming it Health and Beautycard. The concept of the card containing a mirror remained but it was redesigned to give a more mature look and feel. The card can be used physically or digitally via the Superdrug mobile app, available on AppStore and Google play.

=== Podcast ===
On 2 June 2019, Superdrug released an eight-episode podcast titled 'The Beauty of it All'. KVH Studios worked together with the Superdrug Social and Marketing team, alongside content marketing agency, The River Group, to create and launch an eight-episode series of podcasts, hosted by television and radio presenter Vick Hope, and featuring celebrity guests and industry experts. The podcast took a backstage look at the beauty industry and the issues facing it, covering topics such as how veganism is transforming the beauty world, the latest trends in skincare, and the influence of drag culture and makeup on the high street.
