= Stefano Molardi =

Italian organist, harpsichordist, and musicologist

Stefano Molardi (Cremona, 1970) is an italian organist, harpsichordist and musicologist.

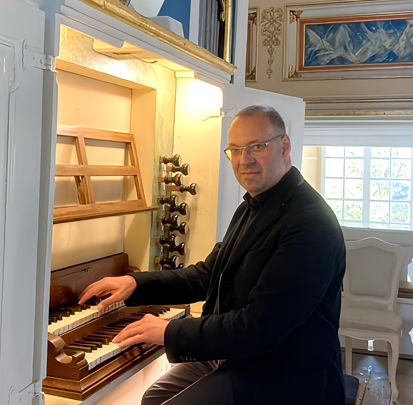
Stefano Molardi

== Biography ==
Graduated in organ from the Conservatory of Piacenza, he later studied with Ewald Kooiman and Michael Radulescu (with whom he completed a three-year course at the Hochschule für Musik – now the University of Music – in Vienna). He also studied harpsichord with Danilo Costantini (with whom he earned his diploma at the Conservatory of Como), further refining his skills on both instruments under the guidance of Luigi Ferdinando Tagliavini and Christopher Stembridge.

He received awards at the organ competitions in Viterbo (1996 – First Prize), Bruges (1997 – Special Jury Prize), and Pasian di Prato (1998 – First Prize).

He has performed across Europe, the United States, Brazil, and Japan, both as a soloist and chamber musician. In 2009, he played the complete organ works of Franz Liszt and César Franck in Lugano.

As a conductor, he has given concerts in Europe and the USA, performing both Italian and German instrumental repertoire from the 17th and 18th centuries, as well as sacred vocal music (Vespro della Beata Vergine by Claudio Monteverdi, La Vergine Addolorata by Alessandro Scarlatti, St. Matthew Passion and St. John Passion by Johann Sebastian Bach) and operatic works (Ademira by Andrea Luchesi, Mitridate by Nicola Porpora). Between 2010 and 2012, he conducted Vivaldi’s Farnace and Giustino at both the Theater an der Wien in Vienna and the Théâtre des Champs-Élysées in Paris.

He was the director and co-founder of IBA – Italian Baroque Academy, an orchestra specializing in performances with historical instruments.

He holds the chair of organ and harpsichord at the University School of Music (SUM) in Lugano and at the Luca Marenzio Conservatory in Brescia. He also teaches masterclasses in organ and harpsichord performance in Europe, the USA, Russia and Japan.

He has recorded for networks such as Radio France, Radio Suisse Romande, Mezzo, and Südwestrundfunk, and for the record labels Christophorus, Divox, Tactus, and most recently Brilliant Classics. For the latter, in 2015, he completed the full recording of Johann Sebastian Bach’s organ works.

Since 2018, he has been collaborating with violinist Gian Andrea Guerra on baroque violin and organ/ harpsichord literature from the 17th and 18th centuries (Duo Seraphim).

== Discography ==
- 2001 – Giovanni Valentini: Mottetti e Madrigali (with l'ensemble La Moderna Prattica), Christophorus - CHR 77238.
- 2003 – Claudio Merulo: Opera Omnia for Organ (Vol. 1), Divox CDX 70309/10-6 (2 CD).
- 2003 – Giovanni Maria Trabaci: Il Primo Libro de Ricercate (with l'ensemble La Moderna Prattica), Tactus - TC 572001
- 2003 – Giovanni Maria Trabaci: Il Secondo Libro de Ricercate (with l'ensemble La Moderna Prattica), Tactus - TC 572002.
- 2003 – Giuseppe Verdi: Trascrizioni per organo, Tactus - TC 812002.
- 2006 – Claudio Merulo: Opera Omnia for Organ (Vol. 2), Divox CDX 70311/12 (2 CD)
- 2006 – Antonio Vivaldi: Sinfonie d’opera (with l'ensemble I Virtuosi delle Muse), Divox - CDX 70501-6
- 2008 – Viaggio a Venezia (with l'ensemble I Virtuosi delle Muse), Divox - CDX 70602
- 2014 – Johann Sebastian Bach: Complete Organ Music, Vol. 1, Brilliant Classics - 94850 (4 CD).
- 2014 – Johann Sebastian Bach: Complete Organ Music, Vol. 2, Brilliant Classics - 94792 (4 CD).
- 2014 – Johann Sebastian Bach: Complete Organ Music, Vol. 3, Brilliant Classics - 94981 (3 CD).
- 2015 – Johann Sebastian Bach: Complete Organ Music, Vol. 4, Brilliant Classics - 95005 (4 CD).
- 2015 – Johann Sebastian Bach: Complete Organ Music, Brilliant Classics - 95105 (15 CD).
- 2015 – Johann Kuhnau: Complete Organ Music, Brilliant Classics - 95089 (3 CD)
- 2016 – Johann Sebastian Bach: Toccata & Fugue - Famous Organ Music, Brilliant Classics - 95166 (2 CD).
- 2017 – Johann Christoph Bach, Johann Michael Bach: Complete Organ Music, Brilliant Classics - 95418 (3 CD).
- 2018 – Giovanni Benedetto Platti: Complete Music for Harpsichord and Organ, Brilliant Classics - 95518 (3 CD).
- 2018 – Bach Family: Complete Organ Music, Brilliant Classics - 95803 (24 CD).
- 2019 – Bach Family: Organ Works, Brilliant Classics - 95884.
- 2022 – Johann Sebastian Bach: Transcriptions, Brilliant Classics - 96413.
- 2023 – Carl Philipp Emanuel Bach: Six Concertos Wq43 Transcribed for 2 Harpsichords, Brilliant Classics - 95584.
- 2024 – 17th Century Courts of Northern-Italy Music for Violin & Organ, Brilliant Classics - 96980.
