= Rossmann (company) =

German drug store chain

- Native name: Dirk Rossmann GmbH
- Industry: Drugstores
- Founded: March 17, 1972; 54 years ago
- Founder: Dirk Rossmann
- Headquarters: Burgwedel, Germany
- Number of locations: 4,285
- Area served: Germany, Poland, Hungary, Czech Republic, Turkey, Spain, Switzerland, Albania, Kosovo, Montenegro, North Macedonia
- Key people: Alice Schardt-Rossmann; Antje König; Michael Rybak; Peter Dreher; Raoul Rossmann
- Revenue: €12,15 billion (2022)
- Number of employees: 56,500 (2021)
- Website: www.rossmann.de

Dirk Rossmann GmbH, commonly referred to as Rossmann, is one of the largest drug store chains in Europe with around 56,200 employees and more than 4000 stores. In 2019 Rossmann had more than €10 billion turnover in Germany, Poland, Hungary, the Czech Republic, Turkey, Switzerland, Albania, Kosovo, Spain and Azerbaijan.

== History ==
The company was founded in 1972 by Dirk Rossmann with its headquarters in Burgwedel near Hanover in Germany. The Rossmann family owns 60% of the company. The Hong Kong–based A.S. Watson Group owns 40%, which was taken over from the Dutch Kruidvat in 2004.

The product range includes up to 21,700 items and can vary depending on the size of the shop and the location. In addition to drugstore goods with a focus on skin, hair, body, baby and health, Rossmann also offers promotional items ("World of Ideas"), pet food, a photo service and a wide range of natural foods and wines. There is also a perfume range with around 200 commercial brands. Rossmann has 29 private brands with 4600 products (as of 2019). In 1997, the first own brands Babydream, Facelle, Sunozon and Winston were introduced. The best-known Rossmann brands are Isana (skin, hair and body care), Alterra (natural cosmetics), Domol (cleaning and laundry detergents) and Alouette (paper tissues etc.). The company logo consists of a red name and the symbol of a centaur integrated in the letter O: a mythical creature made of horse and man from Greek mythology, which symbolically stands for "Rossmann" (English: "Horse man"). The company's own brands have a small centaur symbol above the name.

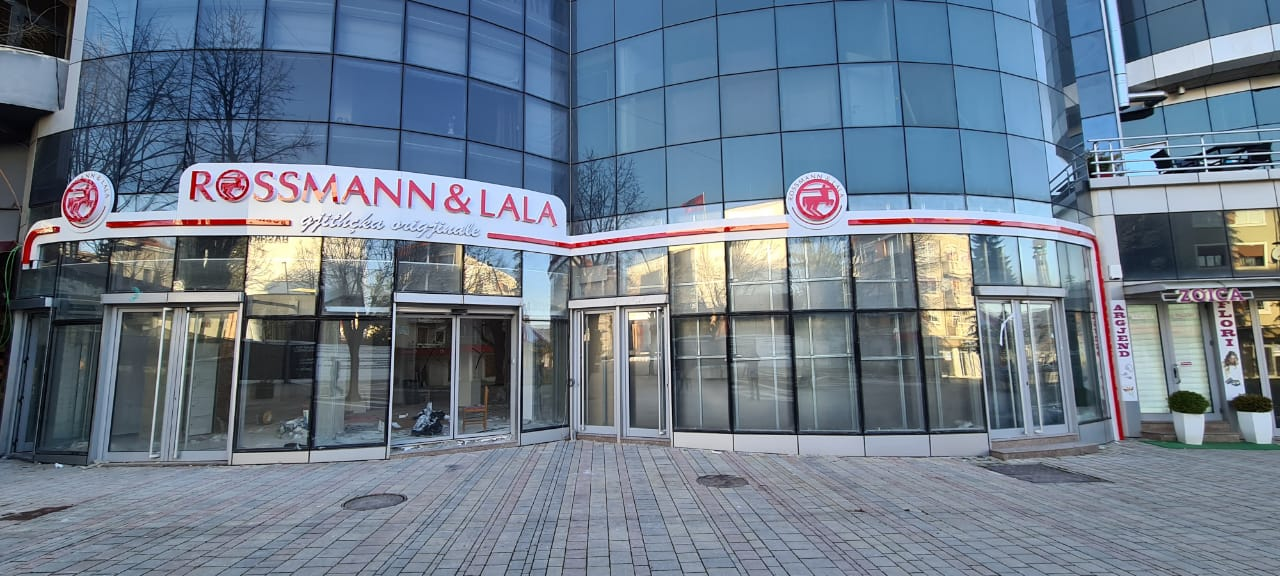
Rossmann branch in Albania

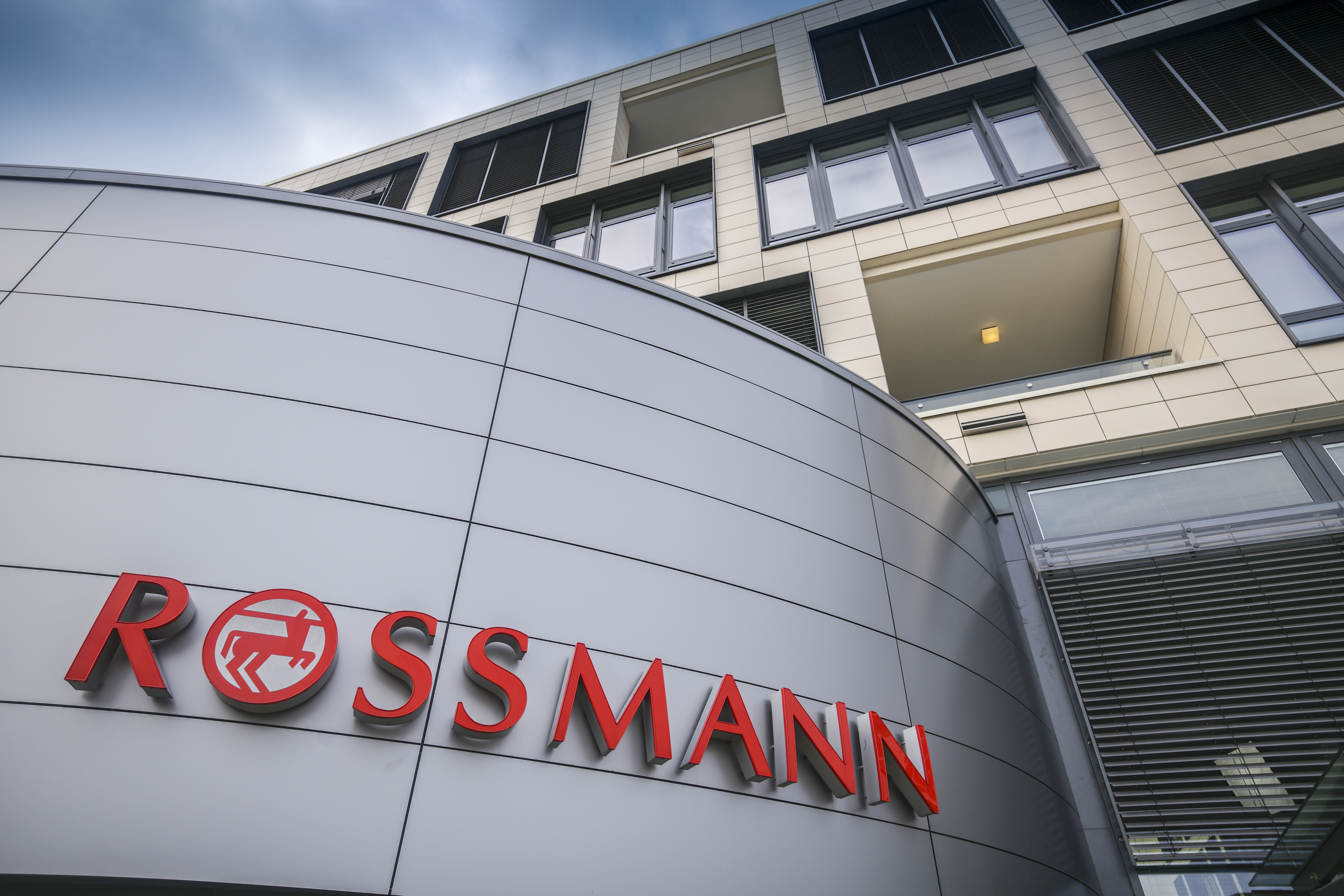
Dirk Rossmann GmbH

Since 2018, Rossmann has been publishing a sustainability report for the development of corporate climate protection activities.

In 2021, sales increased by 8.1 percent to 11.1 billion euros. There are a total of 4,361 Rossmann branches, 2,231 of which are in Germany. Outside Germany, there are branches in Poland (1580), Hungary (more than 230), Czech Republic (more than 150), Turkey (more than 120), Switzerland (1), Albania (15), Kosovo (6) and Spain (5).

== Corporate affairs ==
The key trends of Rossmann in Germany are (as at the financial year ending 31 December):

FY	Revenue (€ bn)	Net profit (€ m)
2016	5.4	181
2017	5.7	173
2018	5.9	224
2019	6.2	243
2020	6.6	303
2021	7.1	398
2022	7.6	437
2023	8.5	452

== Stores ==
The drugstores have an average sales area of over 570 m^{2}. Branches with more than 1300 m^{2} can be found in Berlin and Leipzig. Rossmann's largest branch, with 1385 m^{2}, opened in Hannover in 2016.

Country	No. of stores
Germany	2,263
Poland	1,680
Hungary	250
Czech Republic	160
Turkey	160
Spain	38
Albania	22
Azerbaijan	17
Kosovo	13
Switzerland	8
Montenegro	Planned
North Macedonia	Planned

== See also ==
- dm-drogerie markt
- Müller
- Douglas
