= The Perfume Shop =

British perfumery chain

The Perfume Shop Limited
- Type: Subsidiary
- Traded as: The Perfume Shop
- Industry: Retail
- Founded: 1992
- Headquarters: High Wycombe, Buckinghamshire, UK
- Number of locations: 265+ (2025)
- Area served: UK & Ireland
- Key people: Gill Smith (Managing Director); Peter Mcnab (CEO Health & Beauty UK); Dominic Lai (Group Managing Director)
- Products: Perfume, Aftershave, Fragrance
- Owner: A.S. Watson Group
- Number of employees: 1400 (2010)
- Parent: CK Hutchison Holdings
- Website: http://www.theperfumeshop.com/

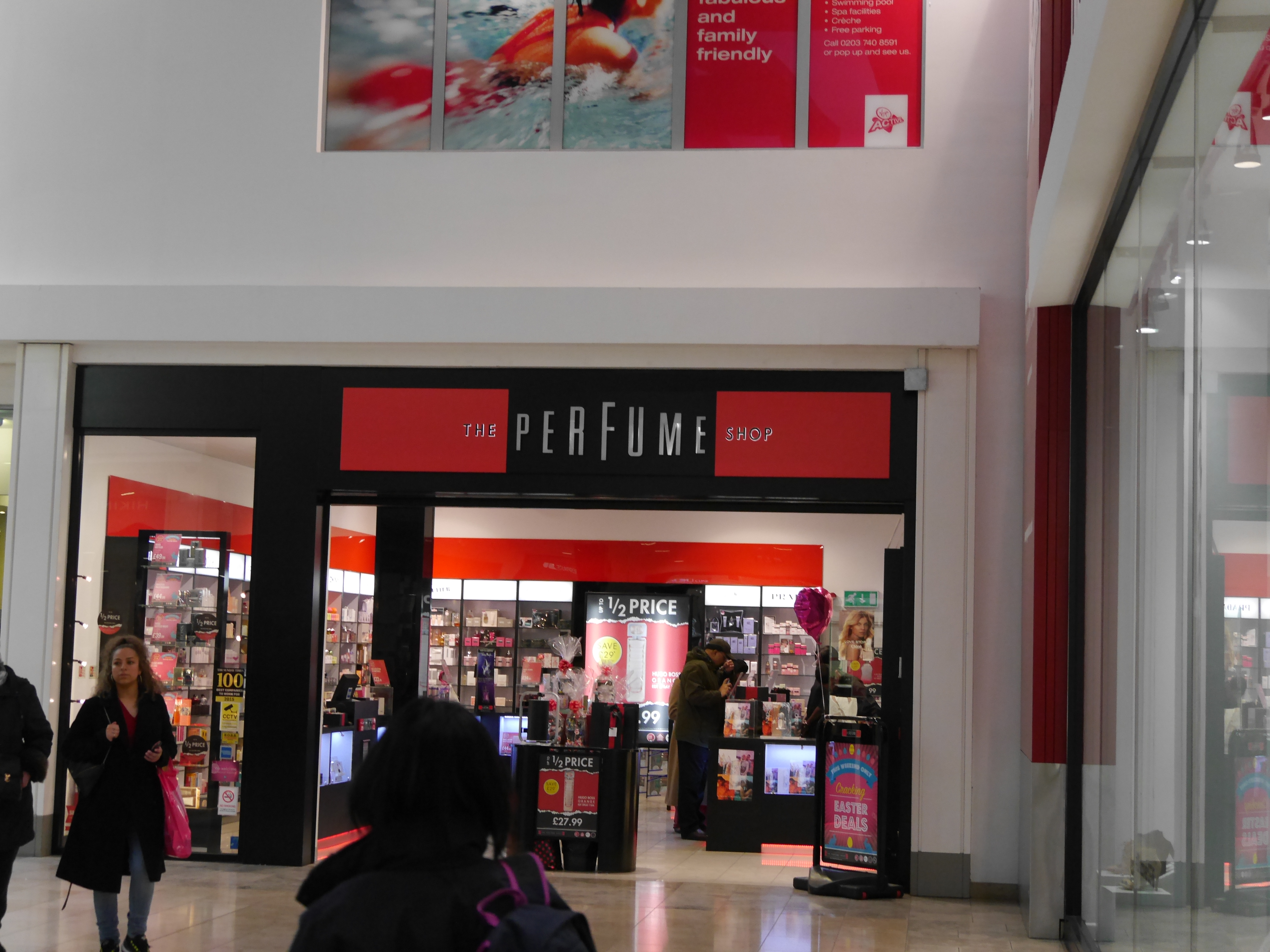
The Perfume Shop, Southside Wandsworth, London

The Perfume Shop Limited is a United Kingdom perfume retailer founded in 1992 and owned by A.S. Watson (Health & Beauty UK) Ltd, which is part of the A.S. Watson Group. (Note: AS Watson (Health & Beauty UK) Limited was formerly known as Watson's Personal Care Stores (UK) Limited from 2000 to 2001, Watson's Personal Care Stores (UK) Holdings Limited from 2001 to 2003, and A.S. Watson (Health & Beauty UK) Limited from 2003 to 2024.) The A.S. Watson Group acquired The Perfume Shop in 2005. The company is based in High Wycombe, Buckinghamshire, with a distribution centre in Dunstable. It is the second largest fragrance retailer in the UK.

== History ==
The Perfume Shop started in 1992. When bought by Merchant Retail Group plc in 1991, it was originally called EauZone. Eauzone had six stores but three were closed down immediately, with only Guildford, Portsmouth and Basingstoke being retained. That year, The Perfume Shop also opened in Meadowhall, Sheffield and The Glades Shopping Centre, Bromley (now Intu). Typically, The Perfume Shop trades from smaller shops than many other retailers and they averaged 400 square feet. Half of their sales came in the six weeks before Christmas. It became a classic brick and mortar operation with both high street shops and a website.

== The Perfume Shop @ Superdrug ==
Since 2010, it has operated a shop in shop concept at Superdrug stores. The project was initially trialled with 11 stores including Aylesbury, Milton Keynes, Bury, Glasgow, and Westfield London.

== Rewards Club ==
In September 2011, it launched a loyalty card scheme named ‘Rewards Club’.

== See also ==
- The Fragrance Shop
