= Kruidvat =

Dutch pharmacy and drugstore chain

- Logo used since 2019.
- Type: Subsidiary
- Industry: Retail
- Founded: September 1975
- Headquarters: Renswoude, Netherlands
- Number of locations: c. 1900
- Area served: Netherlands; Belgium
- Key people: Dominic Lai (Group Managing Director)
- Products: Pharmacy; Health & Beauty
- Owner: AS Watson
- Parent: CK Hutchison Holdings
- Website: kruidvat.nl

Kruidvat is a Dutch retail, pharmacy and drugstore chain specialising in health and beauty products which also has branches in Belgium. The first Kruidvat was opened in September 1975 by Ed During and Dick Siebrand. Kruidvat Holding also owned ICI Paris XL, and Trekpleister, in the Netherlands and Belgium.

Kruidvat had offers of low-priced CDs and books in the past. These usually involved the re-release of pre-existing material, but the company also released new recordings. For example, Brilliant Classics, a series of classical CDs including works by Heinrich Schütz and Carlo Gesualdo, a complete series of harpsichord sonatas by Domenico Scarlatti, and complete series of Mozart and Bach with many new recordings. After 2000, Kruidvat was also active for a time in releasing new, previously unpublished books, for example by Herman Brusselmans, Louise Fresco, Renate Dorrestein and Carry Slee.

It also holds 50% of Rossmann in Poland, Hungary and the Czech Republic, in addition to Superdrug in the United Kingdom since August 2002. Kruidvat Holding was sold to the Hong Kong based company AS Watson in November 2002 for €1.3 billion. Kruidvat’s headquarters are located in Renswoude and their main distribution centre is in Heteren, of which construction was announced in March 2007.

The acquisition of Superdrug was fully cleared by the European Union’s Directorate-General for Competition in September 2002. Superdrug was initially sold to Kruidvat in July 2001.

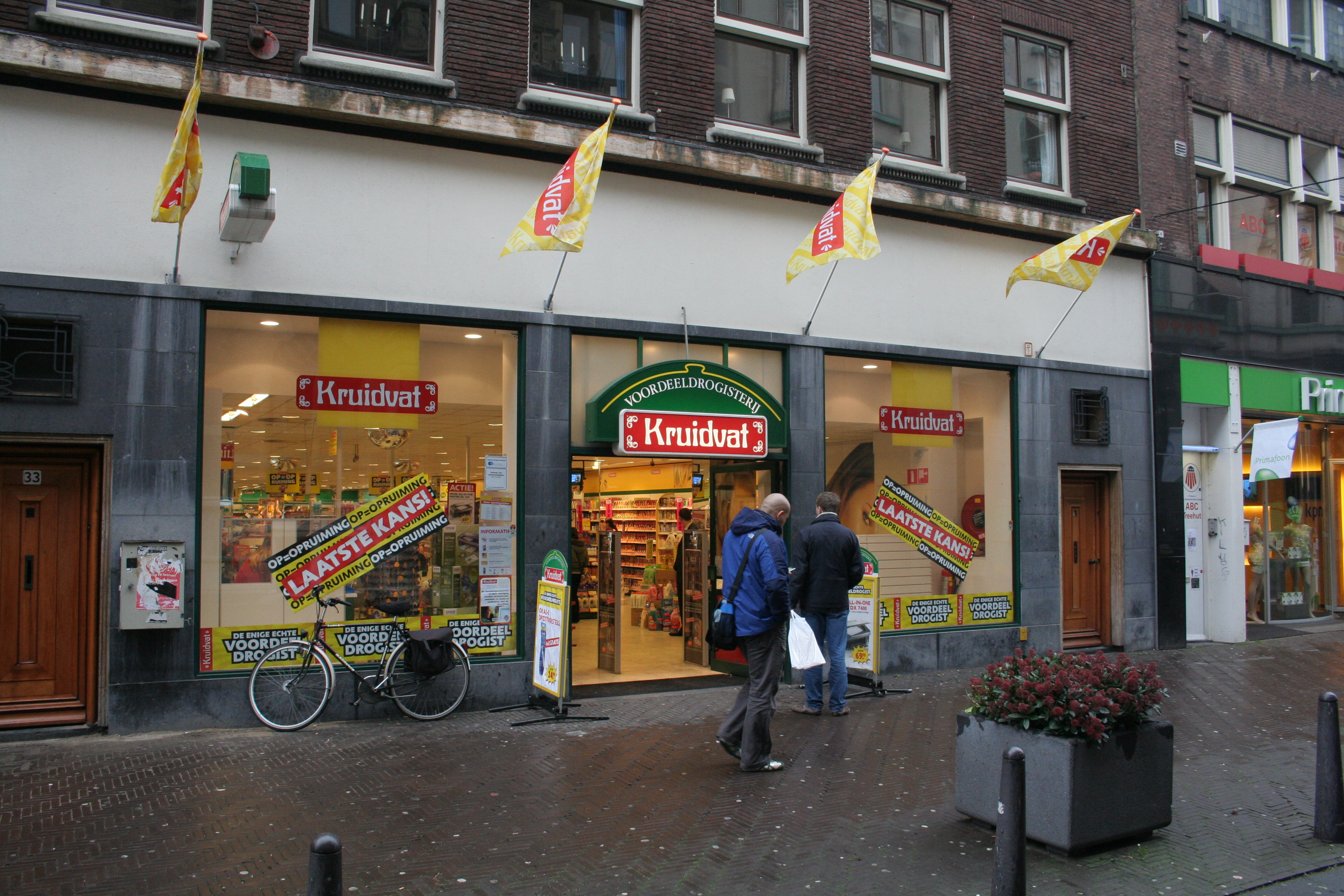
A shop of Kruidvat in The Hague, the Netherlands (January 2008)

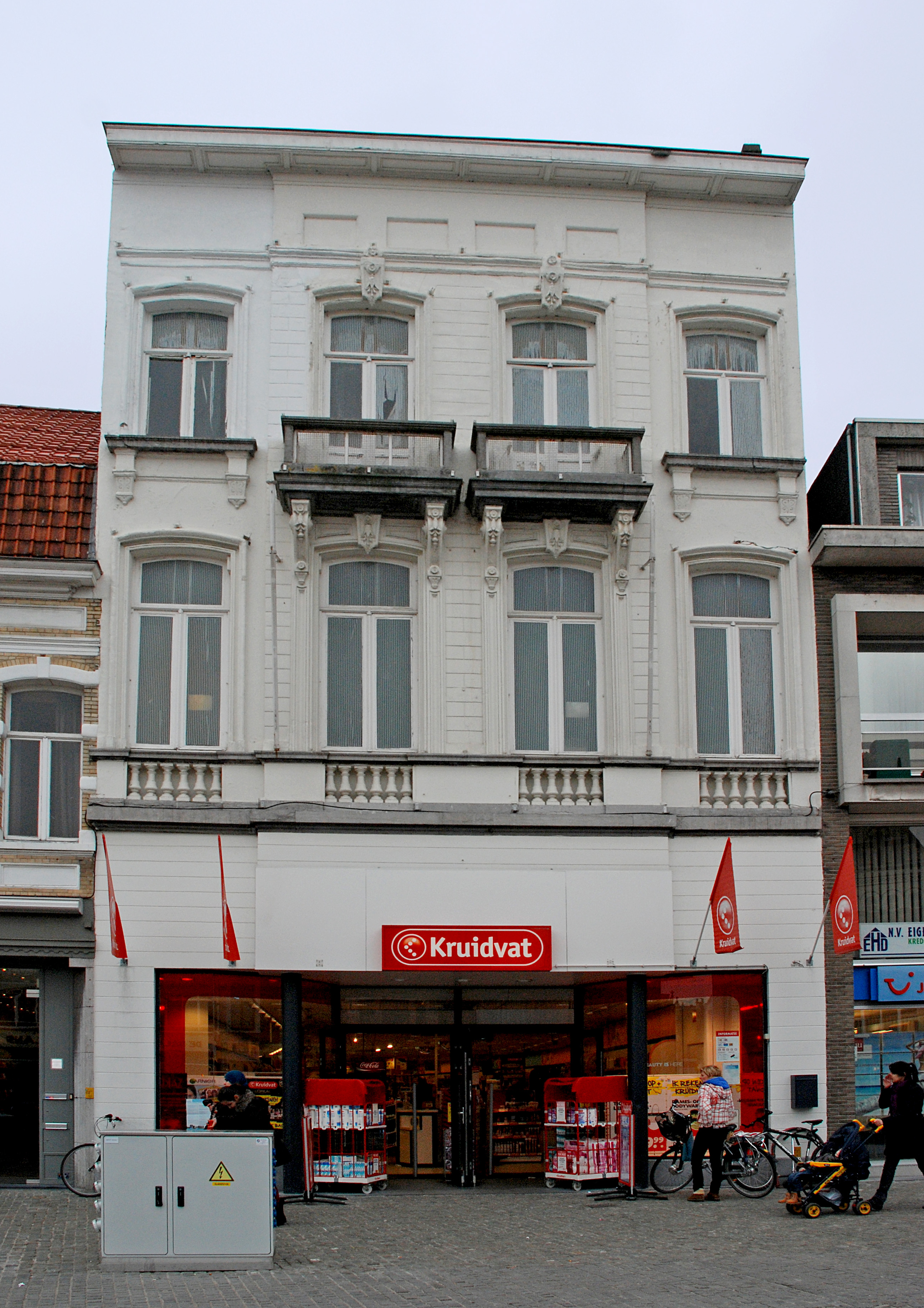
A shop of Kruidvat in Lokeren, Belgium
