= Timeline of reactions to the 2020 Hong Kong national security law (March 2021) =

December events of the 2019-2020 pro-democracy demonstrations in Hong Kong

Timeline of the 2019–2020 Hong Kong protests
2019			March–June				July	August	September	October	November	December
2020	January	February	March	April	May	June	July	August	September	October	November	December
2021	January	February	March	April	May	June	July	August	September–November			December

Few protests took place in March 2021 and there was no large-scale demonstrations in threat of the national security law. The charge against 47 pro-democracy activists for subversion on participating in a primary election was widely condemned by international community.

== 1 March ==
=== First day of 47 pro-democracy activists trial ===
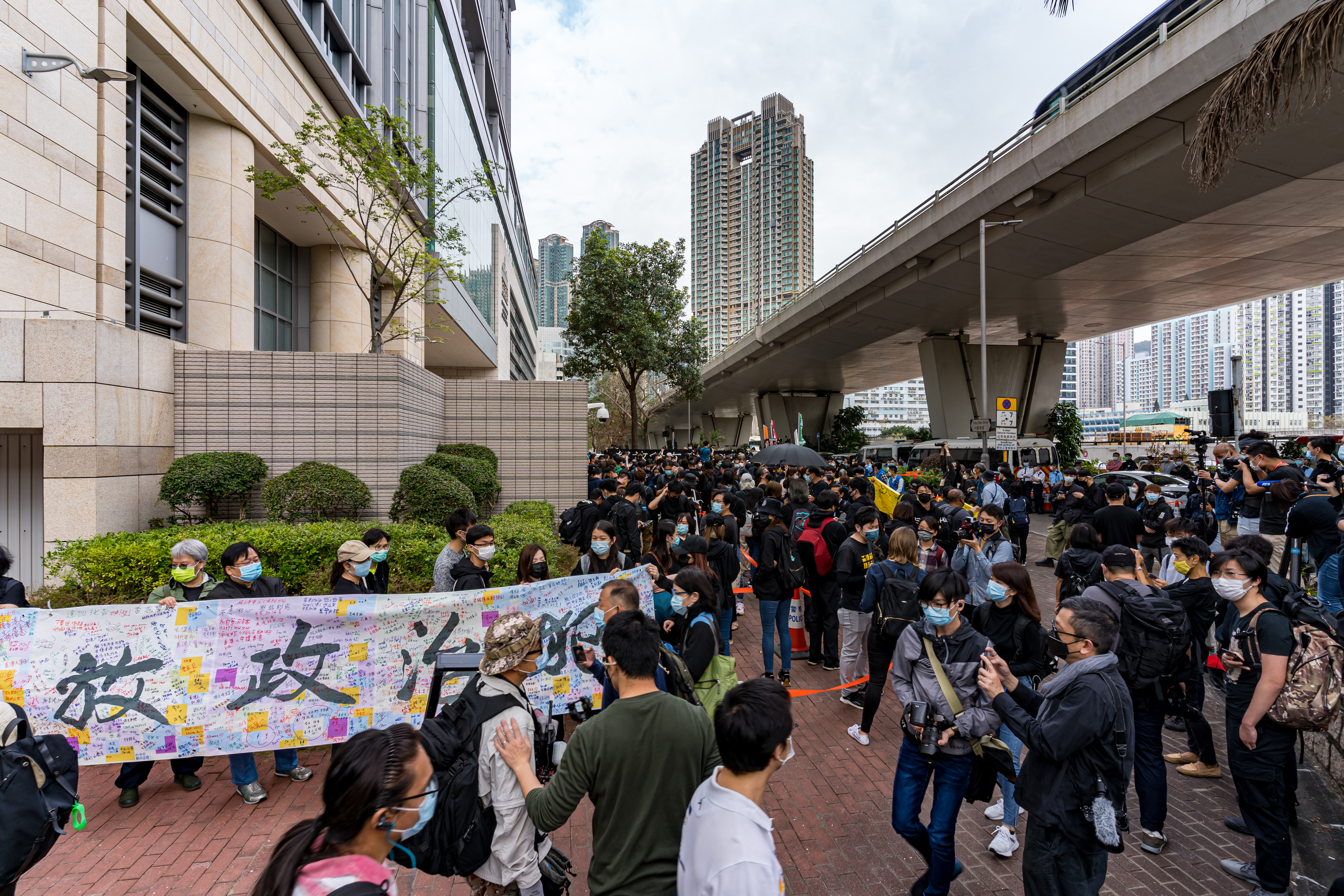
Supporters of the activists gathered outside the West Kowloon Magistrates' Court on 1 March.

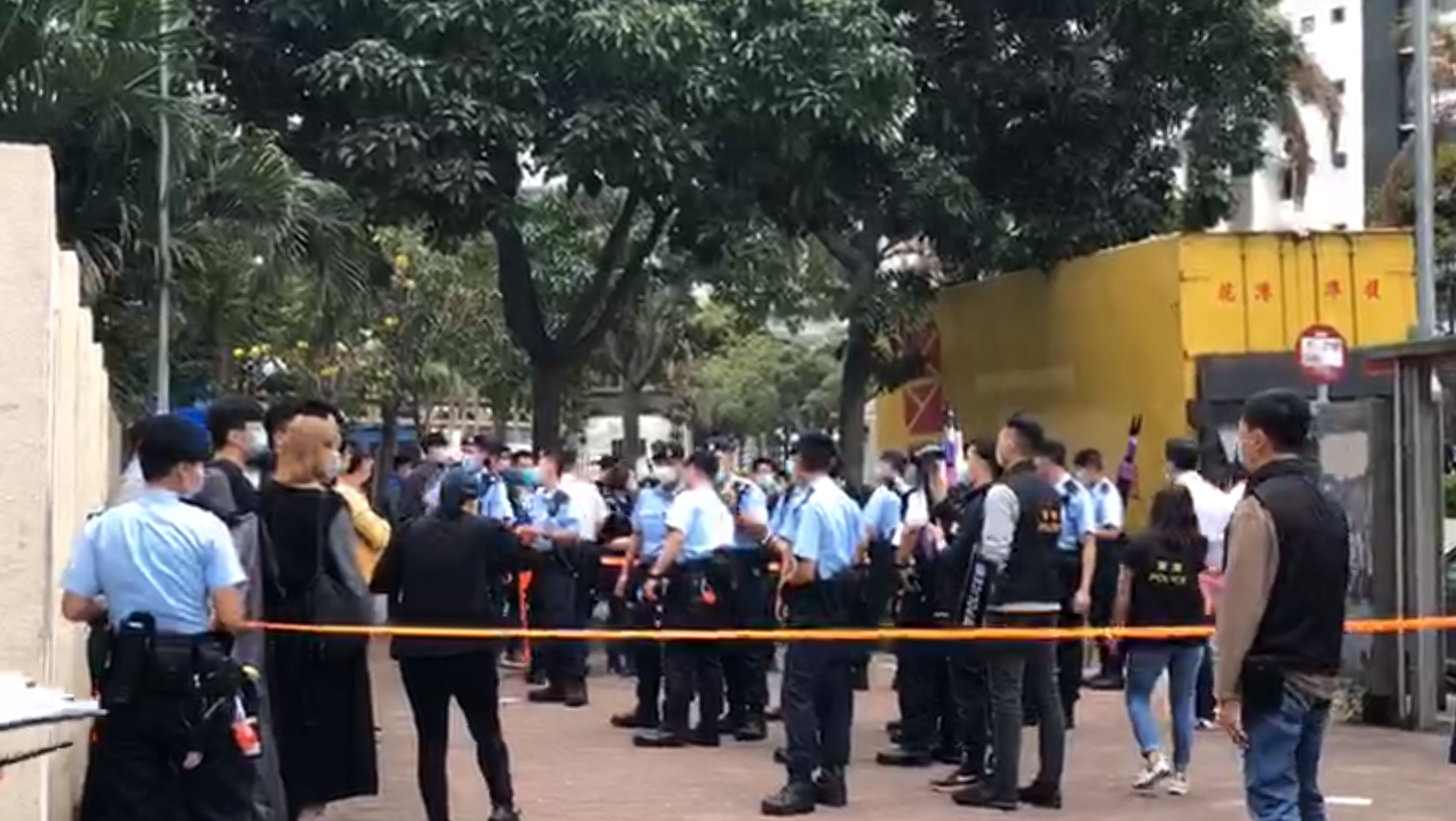
Police cordon extended to the north of Tonkin Street near the bus stop in Fu Cheong Estate, and many citizens were intercepted for stop and search

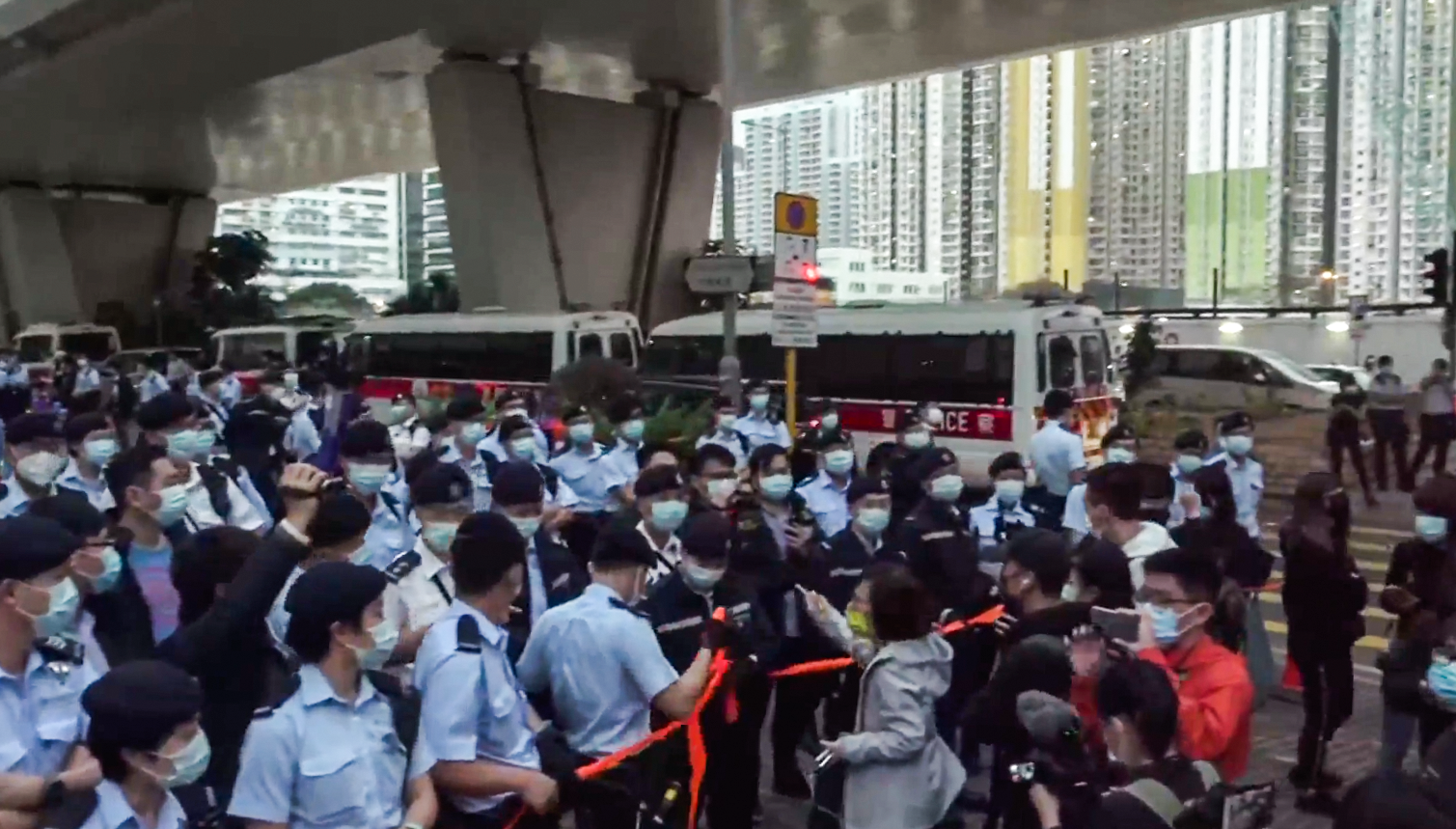
At 6 pm, at least 20 police officers started to advance from Tung Chau Street

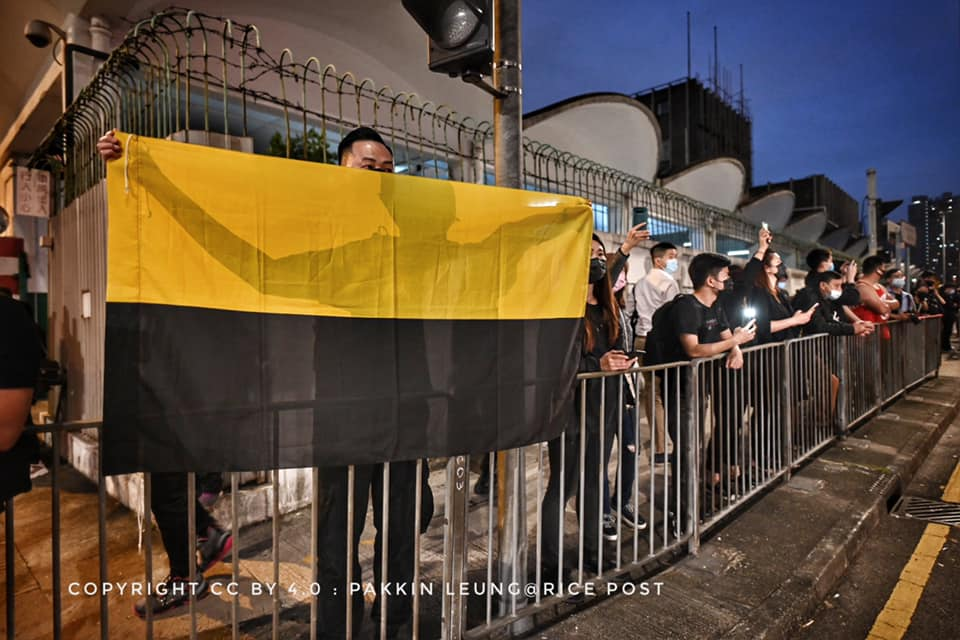
At 7 pm, a large number of citizens were in support of Tung Chau Street

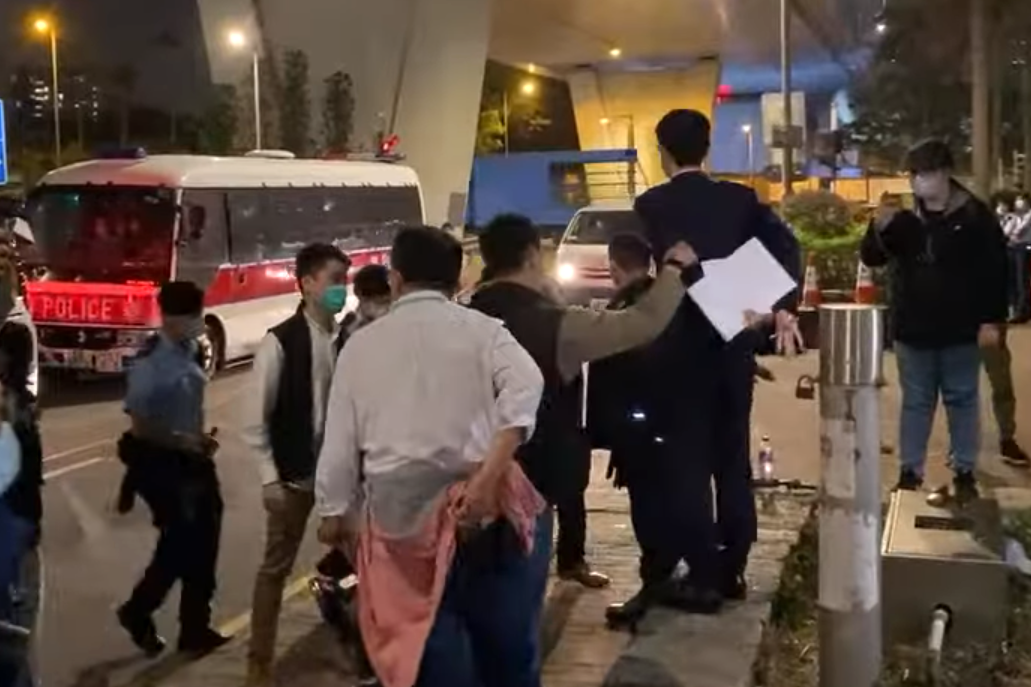
Leo Yau, a lawyer representing the defendant, holding legal documents, entered the court and was refused by the police, and was then taken into a police car

At the beginning of the year, National Security Department of Hong Kong police arrested 55 people for initiating or participating in the internal election of the pro-democracy camp, accusing them of violating the national security law. On the day before, 47 of them were accused of subversion. The 47 did not eat during the 14-hour trial period. By 1 am, 16 had not completed the statement of the reasons for applying bail. One of the defendants, the chairwoman of the Wan Chai District Council, Clarisse Yeung felt exhausted and fainted. She was sent to hospital, while the other three (Roy Tam, Mike Lam, Leung Kwok-hung) were also unwell and sent to Caritas Medical Centre for treatment. Chief Magistrate Victor So decided to adjourn the court by 2:45 a.m. and continued the trial at 11:30 a.m. the next day.

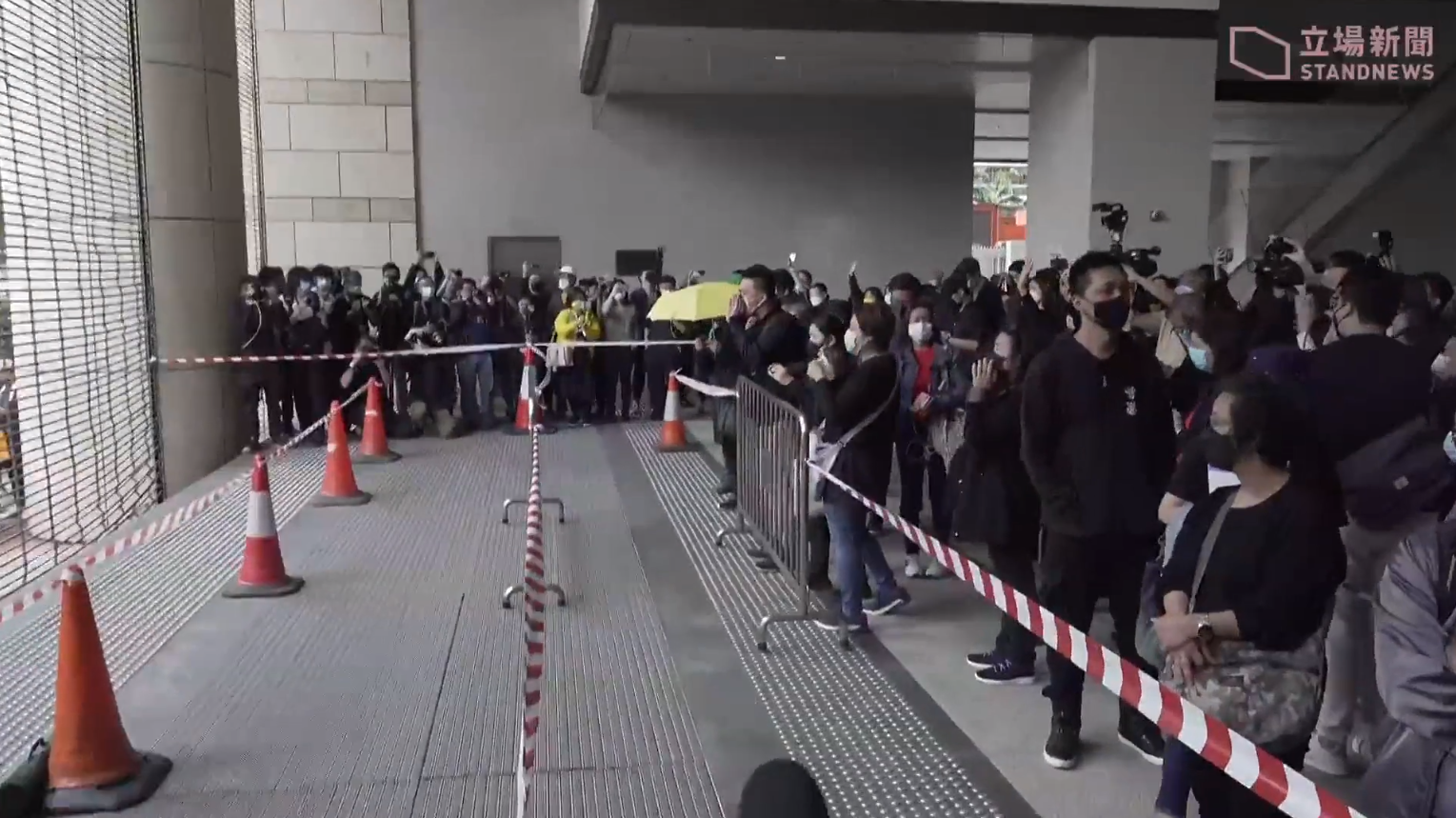
A large number of supporters inside and outside the court, raising the "Five Demands" hand gesture

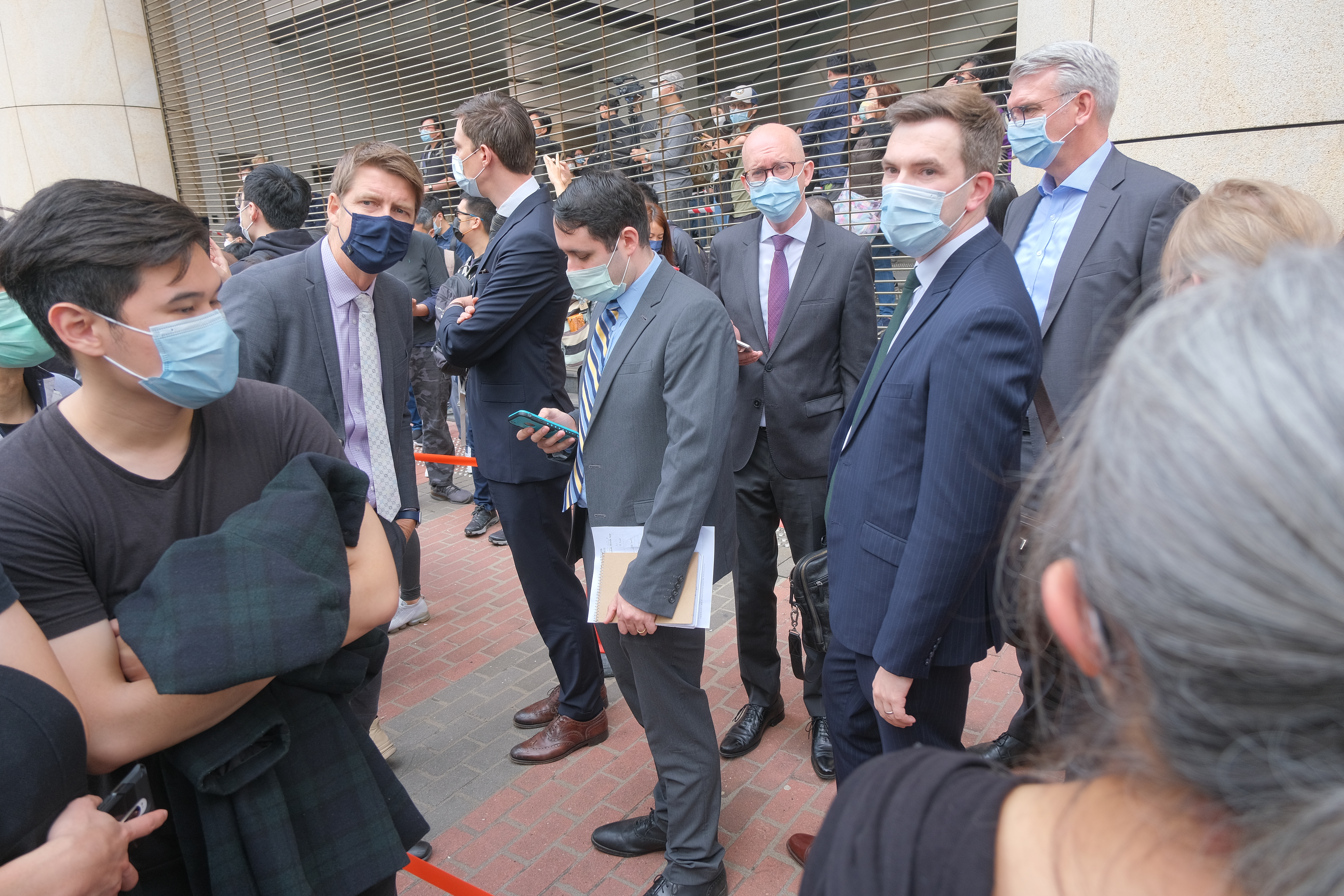
Foreign representatives were there to wait in line for the court hearing

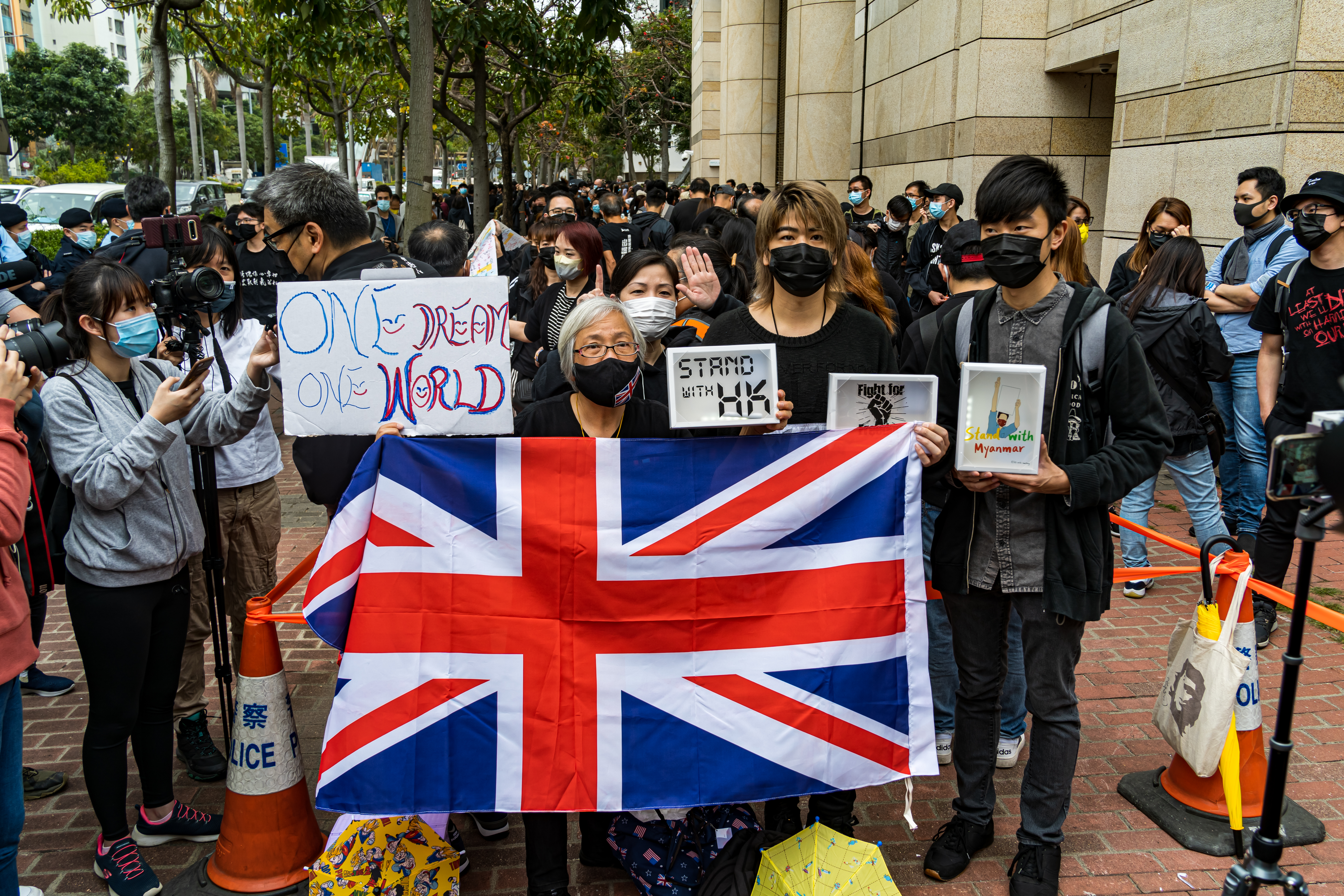
Grandma Wong, singer Tommy Yuen and district councilor Cheung Man-lung were in support at the scene

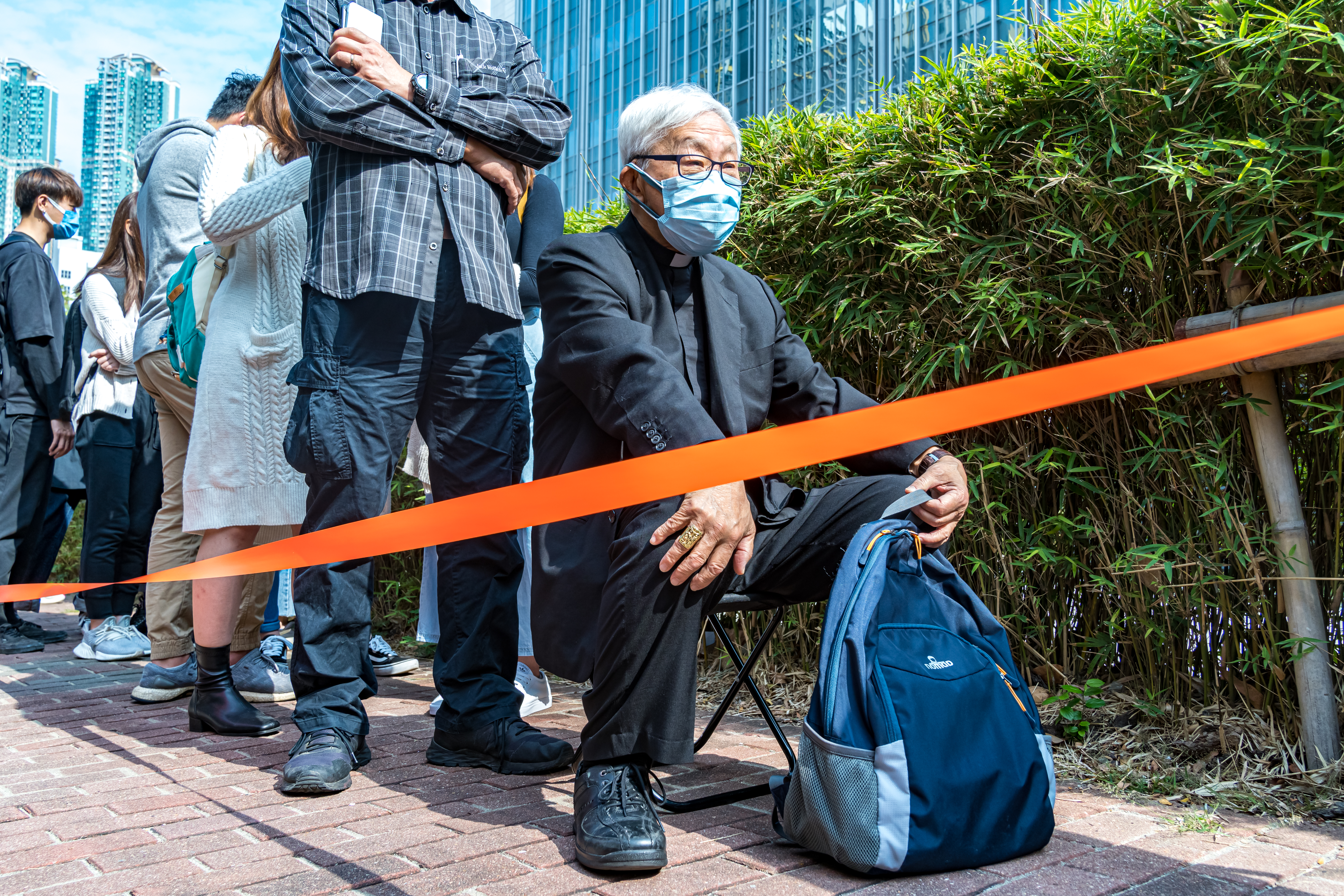
Cardinal Joseph Zen is waiting for the public gallery outside

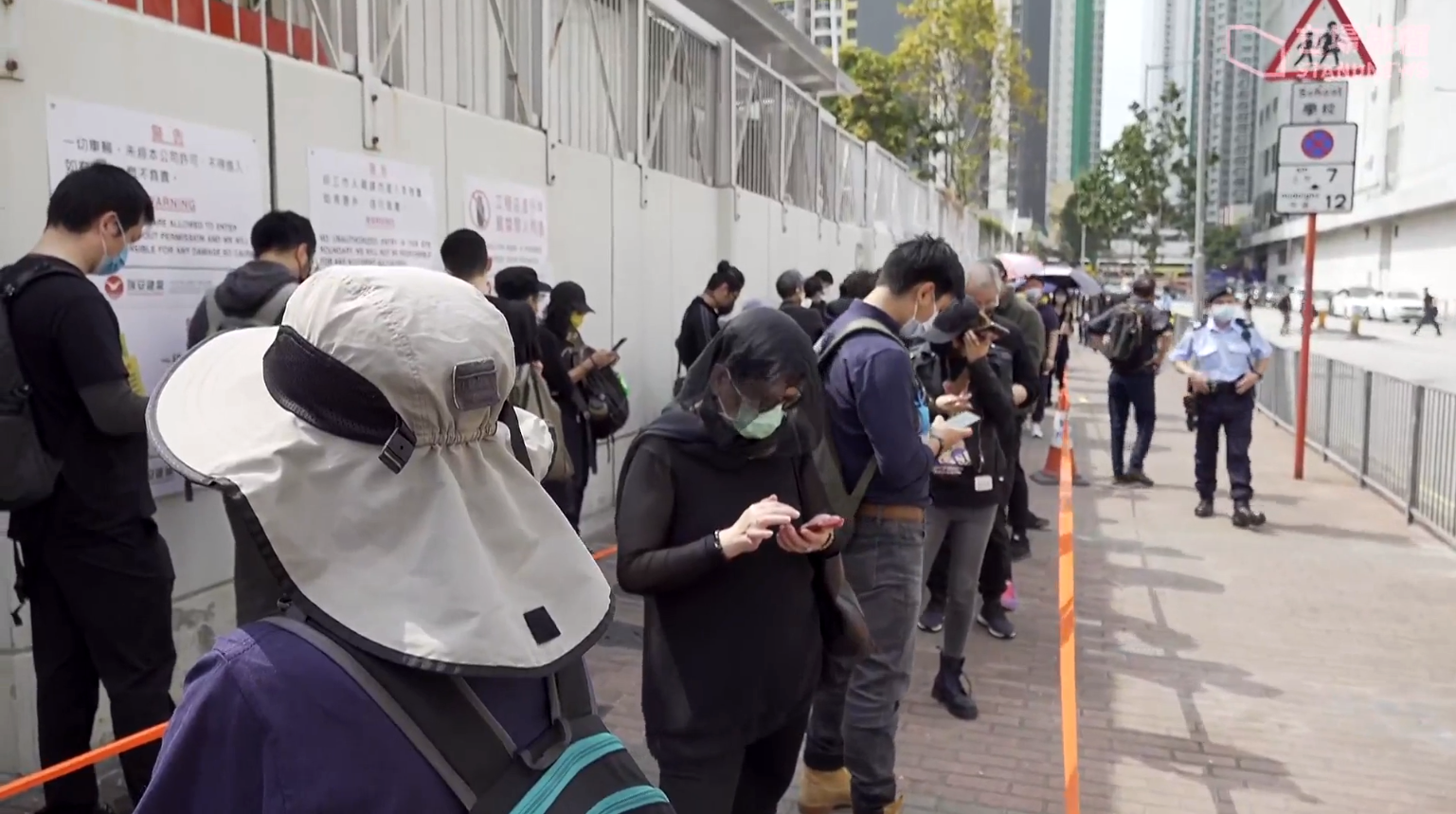
People waiting for the number of the public gallery are as far away as Cheung Fat Street 400 meters away

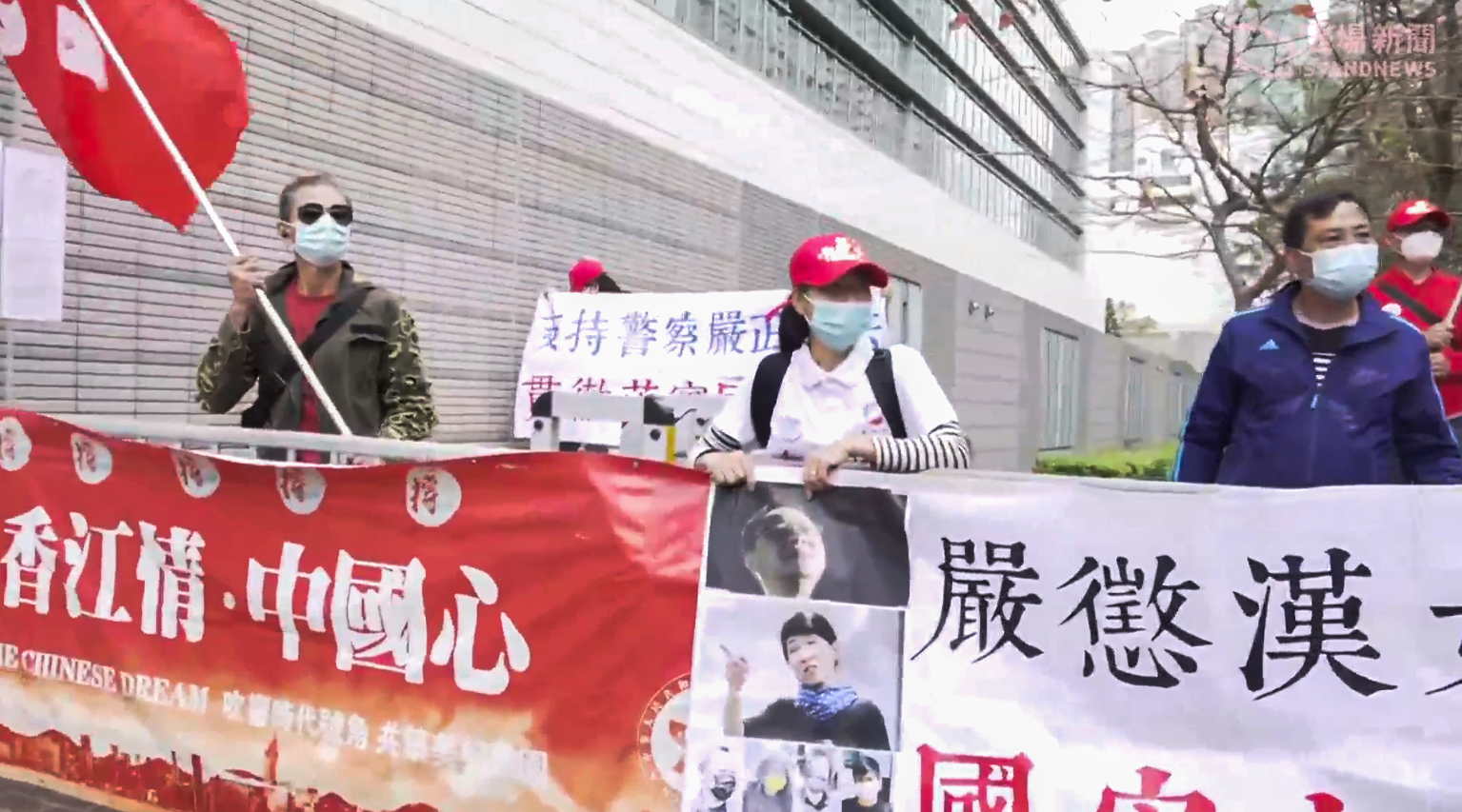
Group of pro-Beijing protesters rally to support the police outside the court

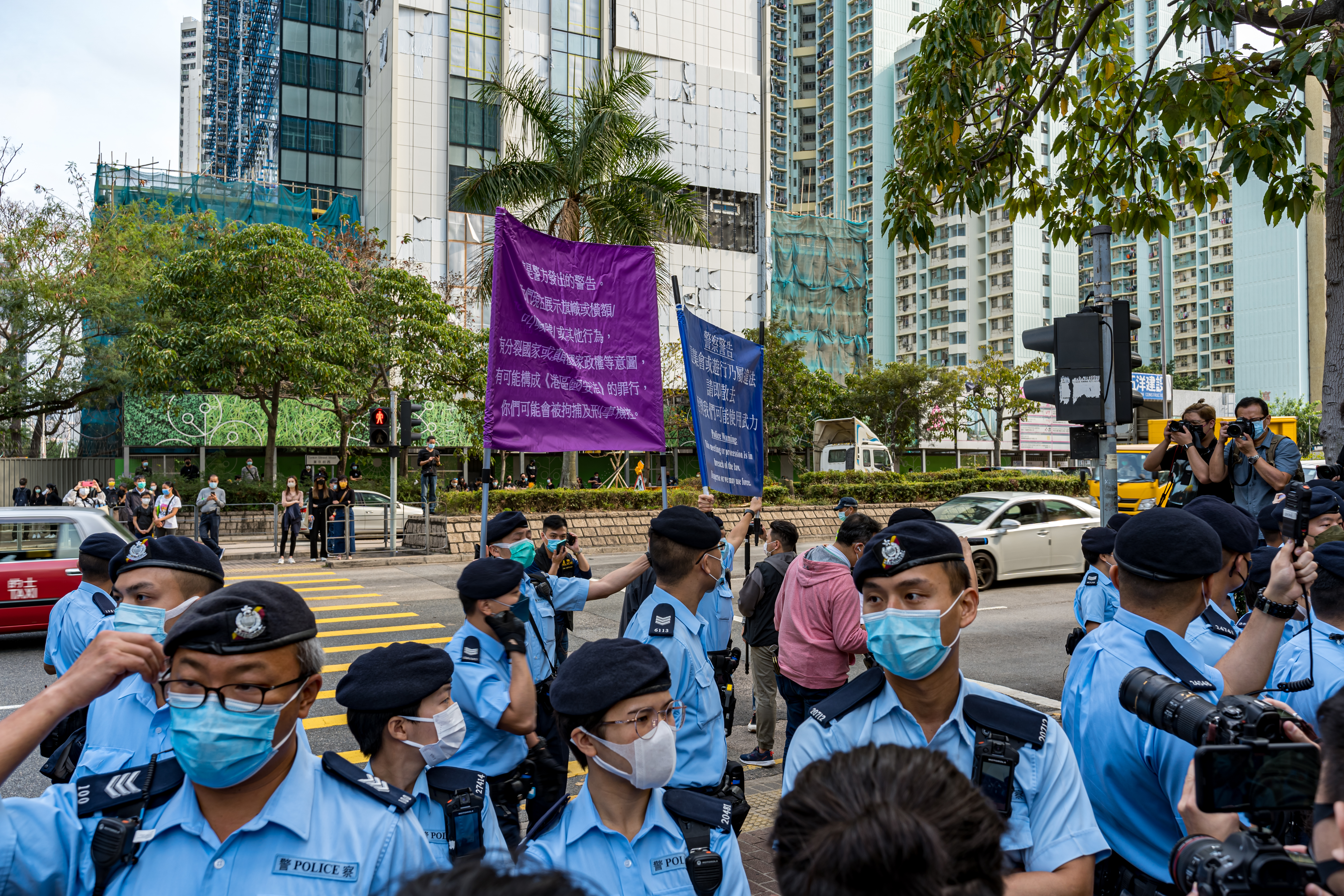
Police officers raised the purple and blue flags to the citizens lining up outside the court building

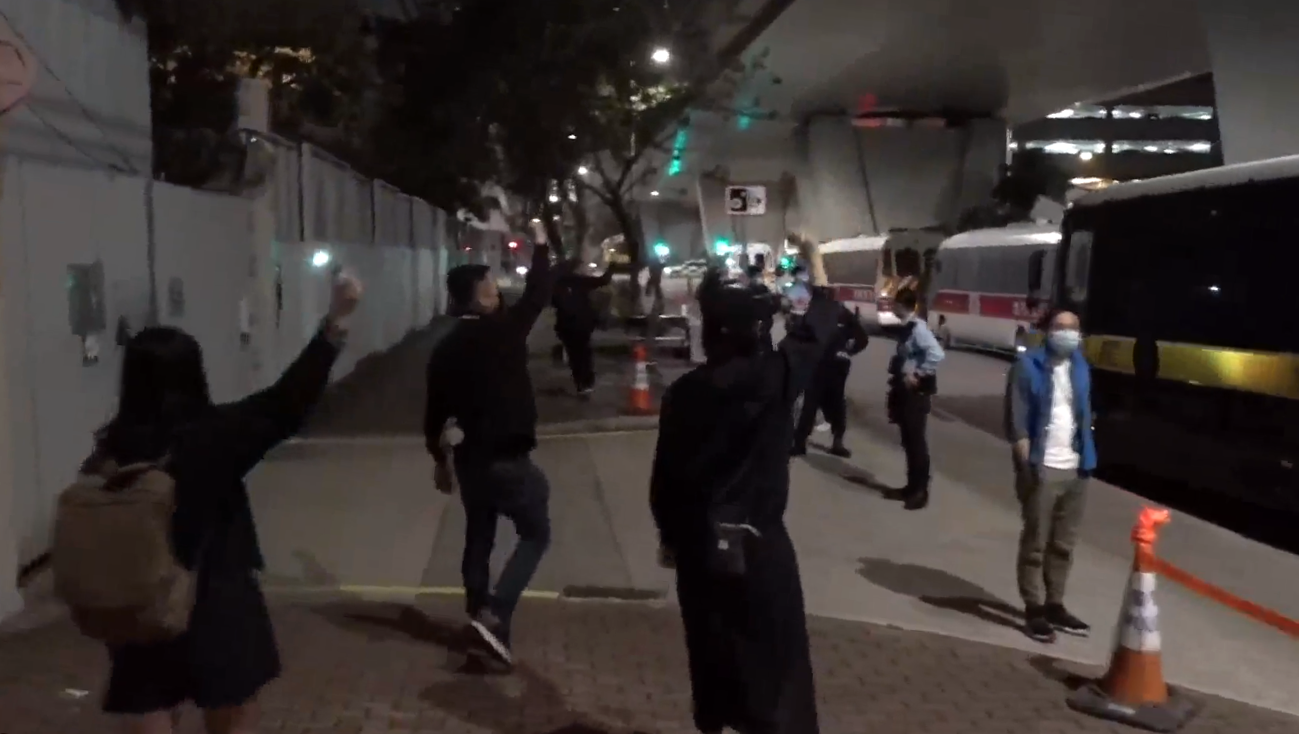
Shortly after midnight there are still people left behind prison vans

=== Rallies in the UK solidarity for 47 activists ===
At least 3 cities in the United Kingdom held rallies in solidarity with 47 activists. The rally in London was held at Piccadilly Circus.The rally members waved the banner of Liberate Hong Kong, Revolution of Our Times, and some used the traditional instrument of the British Army Band to play Glory to Hong Kong. Ted Hui, former Legislative Council member who participated in the primary election of the pro-democracy party, attended the event. He felt very angry about the charges and was very emotionally troubled. It is hoped that it can further promote the implementation of sanctions by various countries. In the Piccadilly Gardens of Manchester, more than 100 people participated in the rally. Although the name of the rally has the word "sitting", most of the participants stood on the grass. Samson Chan, Hui's assistant, gave a speech. The reporter found that the participants were mainly "new immigrants" who entered the country through LOTR, while foreign students accounted for only a minority. In Reading, a city on the west side of London, participants gathered in silence and lined up in two rows on the street. As the UK was still lockdown, police officers arrived at the scene and asked the participants to leave immediately. Participants dispersed peacefully.

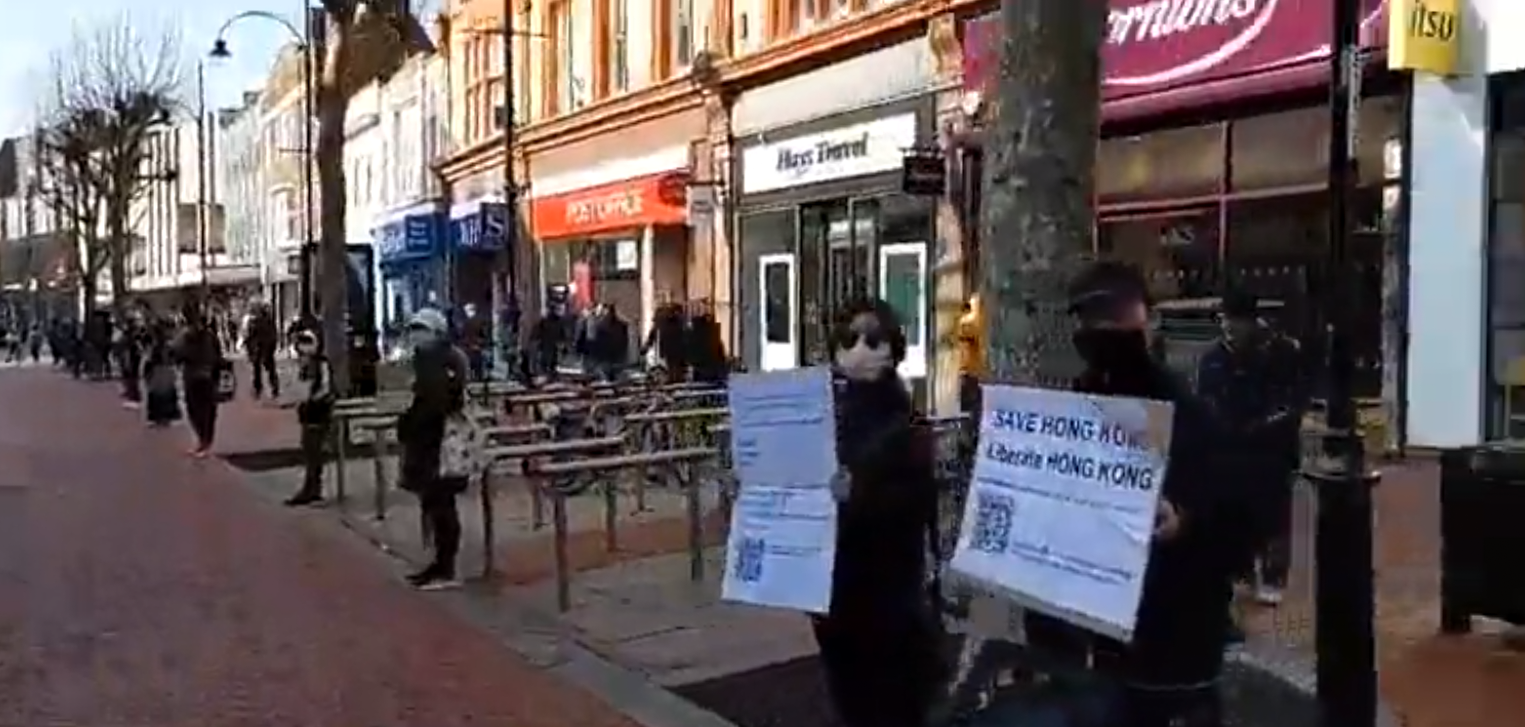
In Reading, the participants gathered in silence

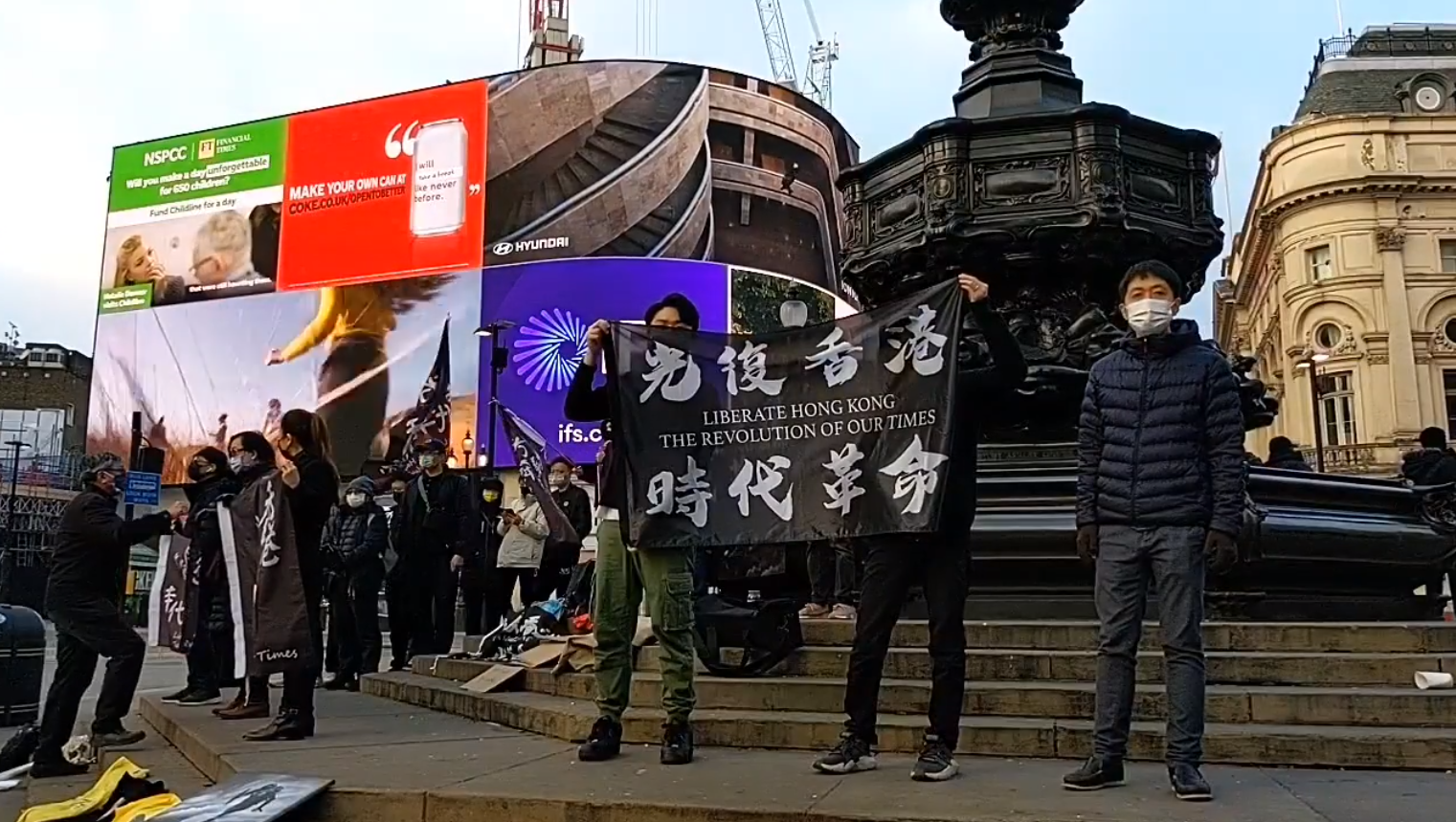
The rally in Piccadilly Circus in London. Former Legislative Council member Ted Hui came to support

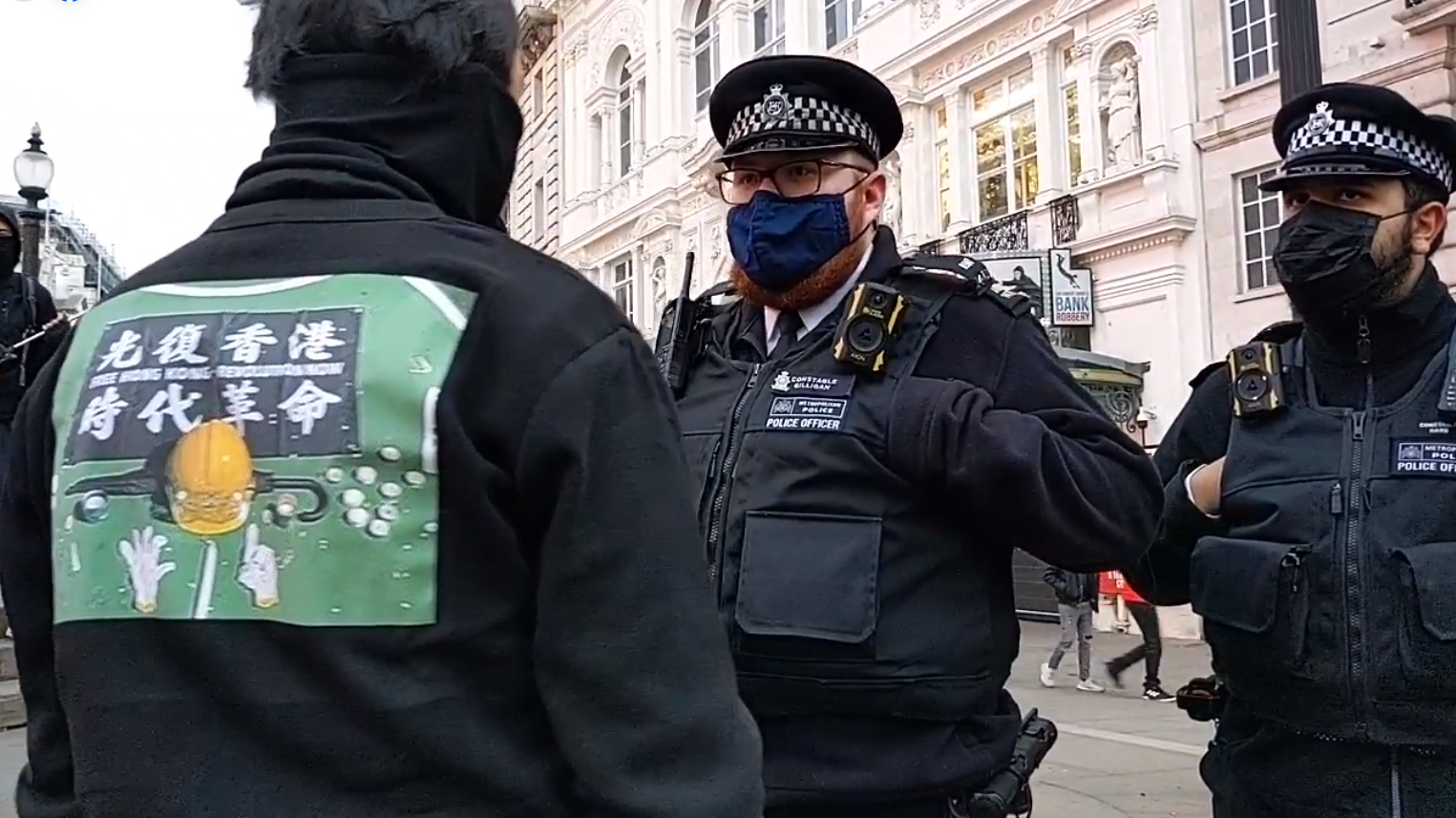
London police arrived at the scene and asked the participants to leave immediately

=== Xia Baolong urges authorities to severely punish the activists ===
Director of the Hong Kong and Macau Affairs Office Xia Baolong singled out three pro-democracy activists charged under the national security law, Joshua Wong, Jimmy Lai and Benny Tai, saying they were "extremely wicked" and "must be severely punished for their illegal actions." Hong Kong Free Press enquired with the Department of Justice about the department's position on the remarks of Xia, given its statements that comments from third parties on ongoing court proceedings were inappropriate. The department pointed to the words "in accordance with the law" which Xia had added; it refused to elaborate on the significance of this comment in this context, and on the question of whether anyone else would be able to legally use the formulation of Xia.

=== John Lee speaks to the UN Human Rights Council ===
Secretary for Security John Lee said in a video conference of the United Nations Human Rights Council that since the implementation of the Hong Kong national security law in July 2020, there has been a significant reduction in the number of people advocating Hong Kong independence and the number of arrests involved in violent incidents has also been reduced by 50%, the effect is described as significant. He also emphasized that the national security law has not harmed the rights and freedoms of Hong Kong citizens. He pointed out that so far only 99 people have been arrested for violating the national security law, accounting for a small part of the overall population. Lee reiterated that all prosecutions related to the national security law are carried out fairly in accordance with the law. In addition, Chen Xu, Chinese Ambassador to the United Nations, said that the Hong Kong national security law has filled up the loopholes in Hong Kong’s national security.

== 2 March ==
=== Second day of 47 pro-democracy activists trial ===
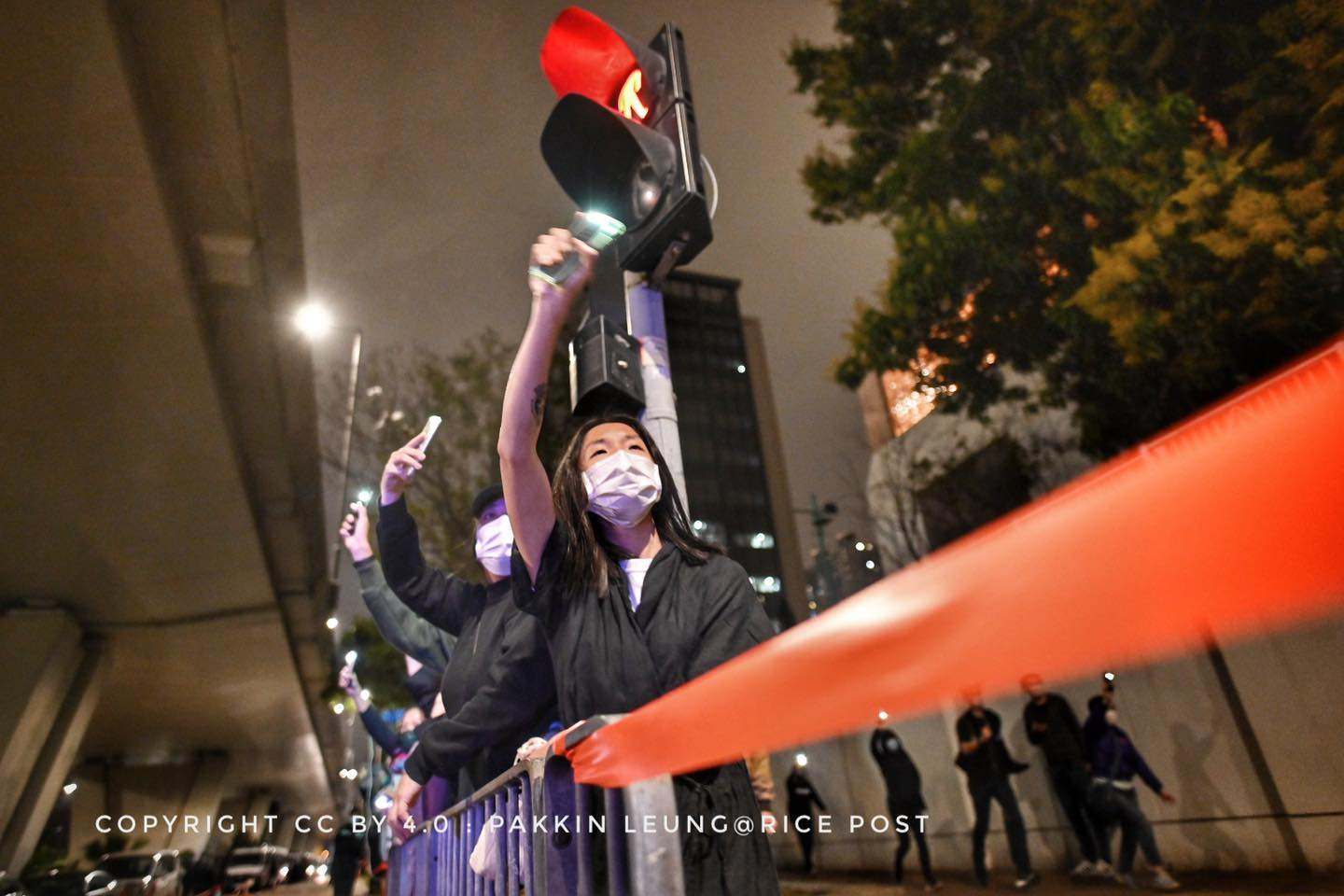
Supporters waving mobile phone flashlight to support the activists

The second day of the trial resumed late on the next morning, giving defendants little time to rest. Defence lawyers voiced criticism of the court over defendants not being given the opportunity to shower or change clothes for four days since they were detained on 28 February. One of the defendants, Lawrence Lau, 53, also a practicing barrister, apologised for not bathing for three days before addressing the court. He added: "When someone is stripped of their freedom, they are also stripped of their personal hygiene and appearance, which makes them lose confidence. I do not understand why I ended up in custody when I have been law-abiding my whole life." A defence counsel also told the court that his defendants had not been sent back to the Lai Chi Kok Reception Centre until nearly 7 am on 2 March. "The defendants have to attend court hearings that started at 8 this morning [yesterday], which means they could only rest for at most two hours, causing them to be physically tormented," he said. Amnesty International Hong Kong program manager Lam Cho Ming warned that an extended hearing "along with insufficient time to rest could potentially violate the right to a fair trial." Chief magistrate Victor So called a halt to the second day of hearings at 10:36 pm on 2 March.

Another defendant, Winnie Yu, 33, a nurse and chairwoman of the Hospital Authority Employees Alliance, was suspended from her duties by the Hong Kong Hospital Authority after she was prosecuted.

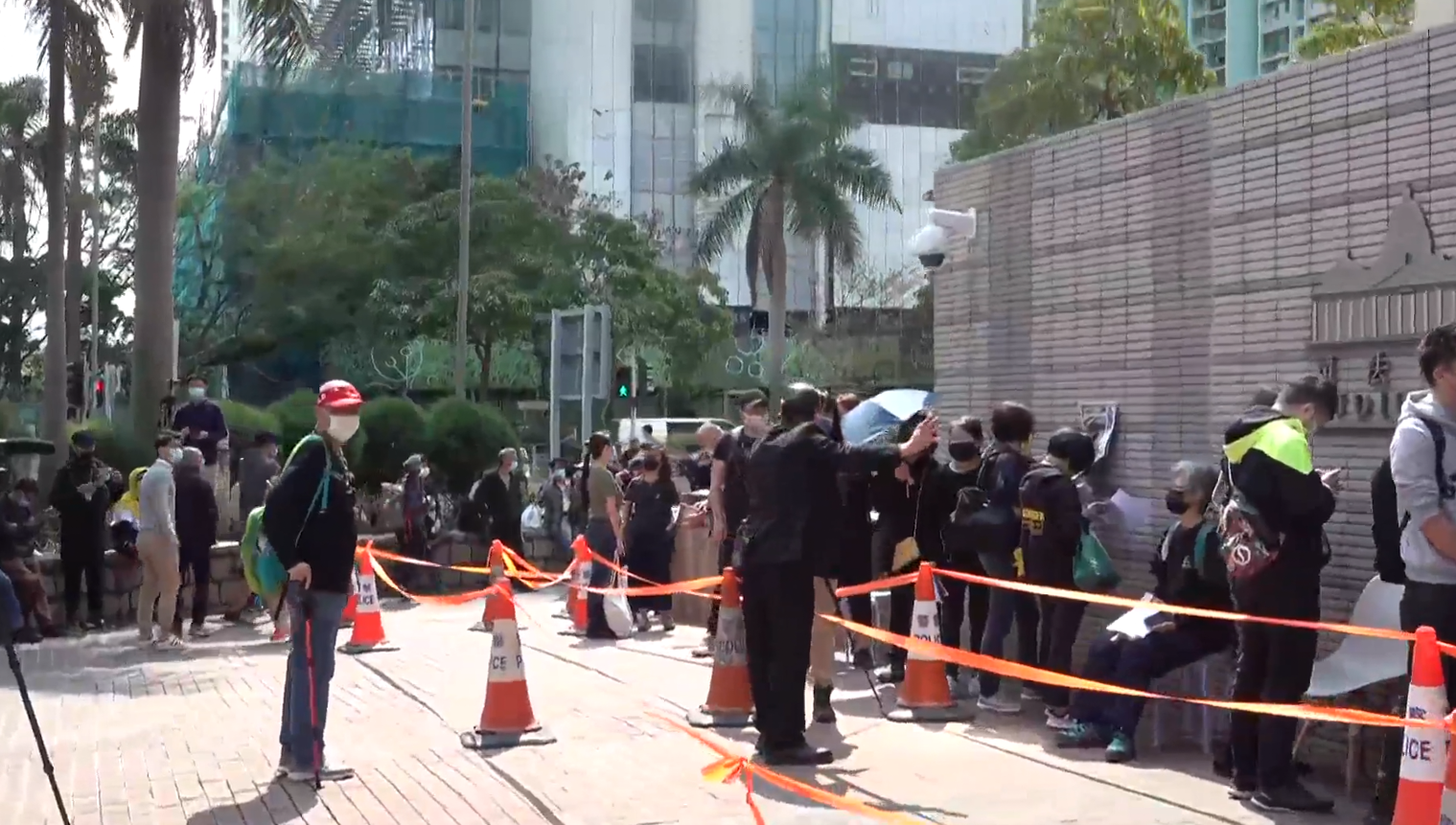
Fewer people queued up for the public gallery to be called up than on the first day

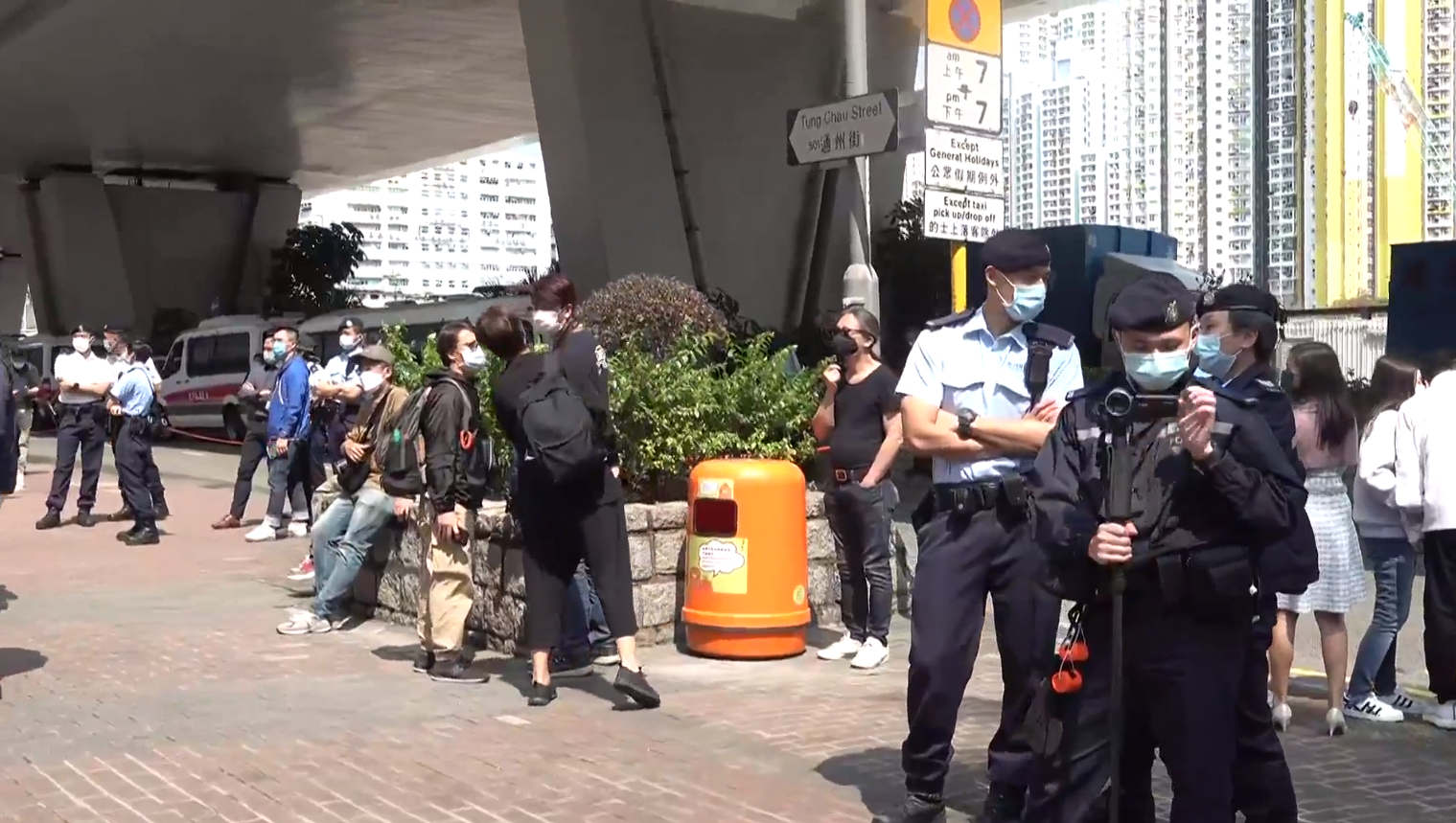
Police officers on guard outside the court

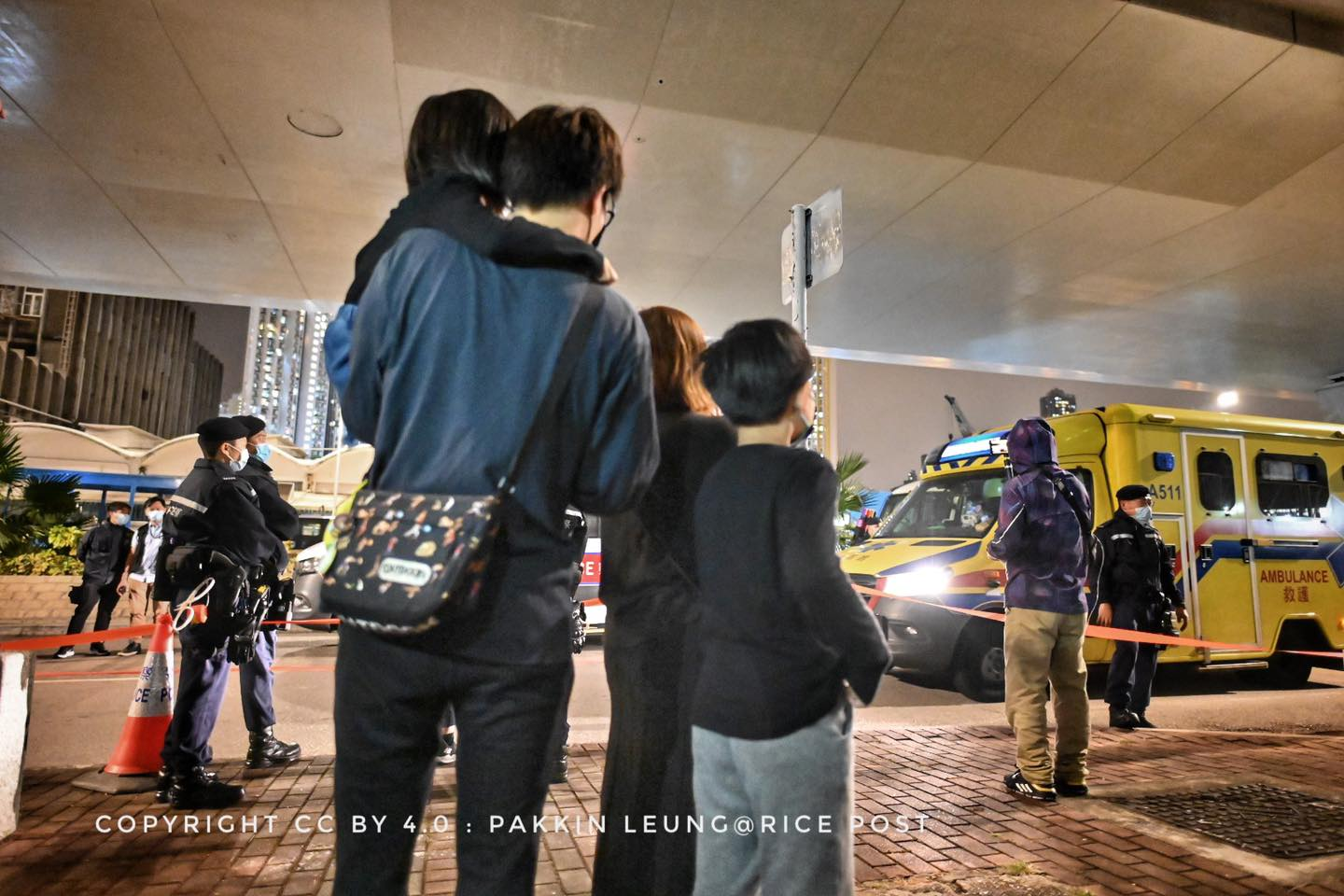
Parents brought their children in the court to "send cars" to stay behind to support the arrested

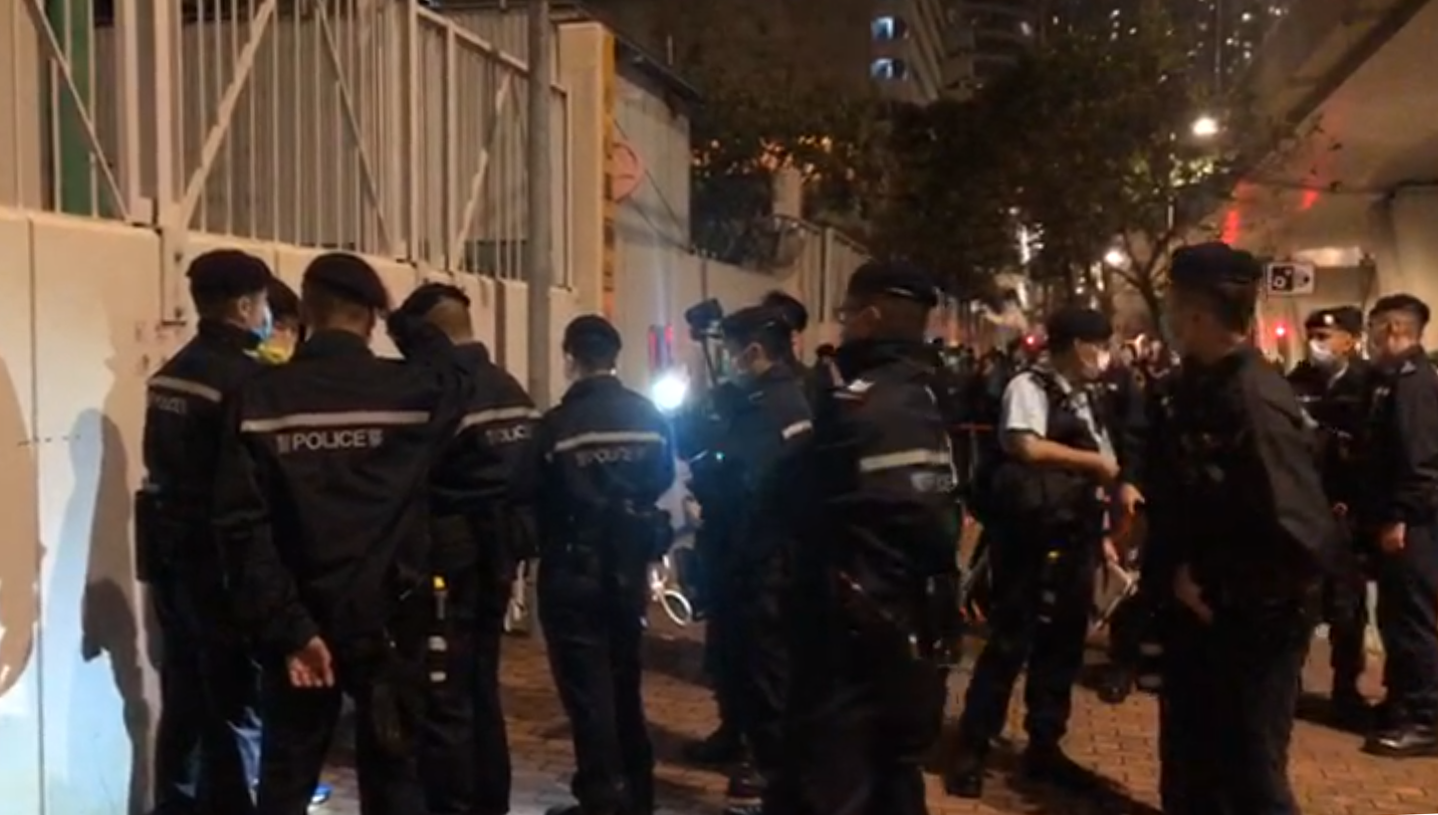
Two citizens were stopped for investigation because they failed to show their press cards

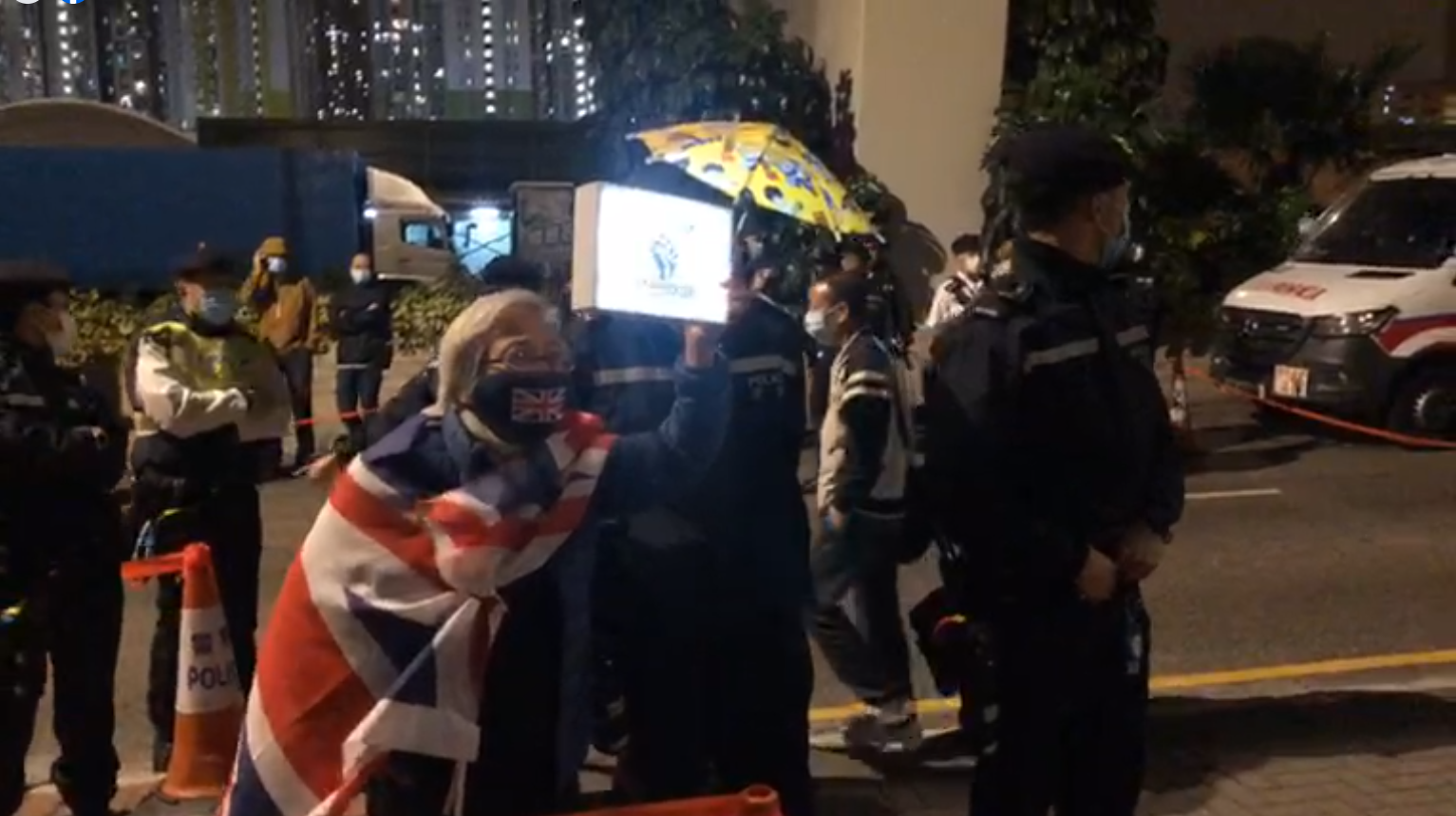
Grandma Wong's solidarity outside the court

== 3 March ==
=== Third day of 47 pro-democracy activists trial ===
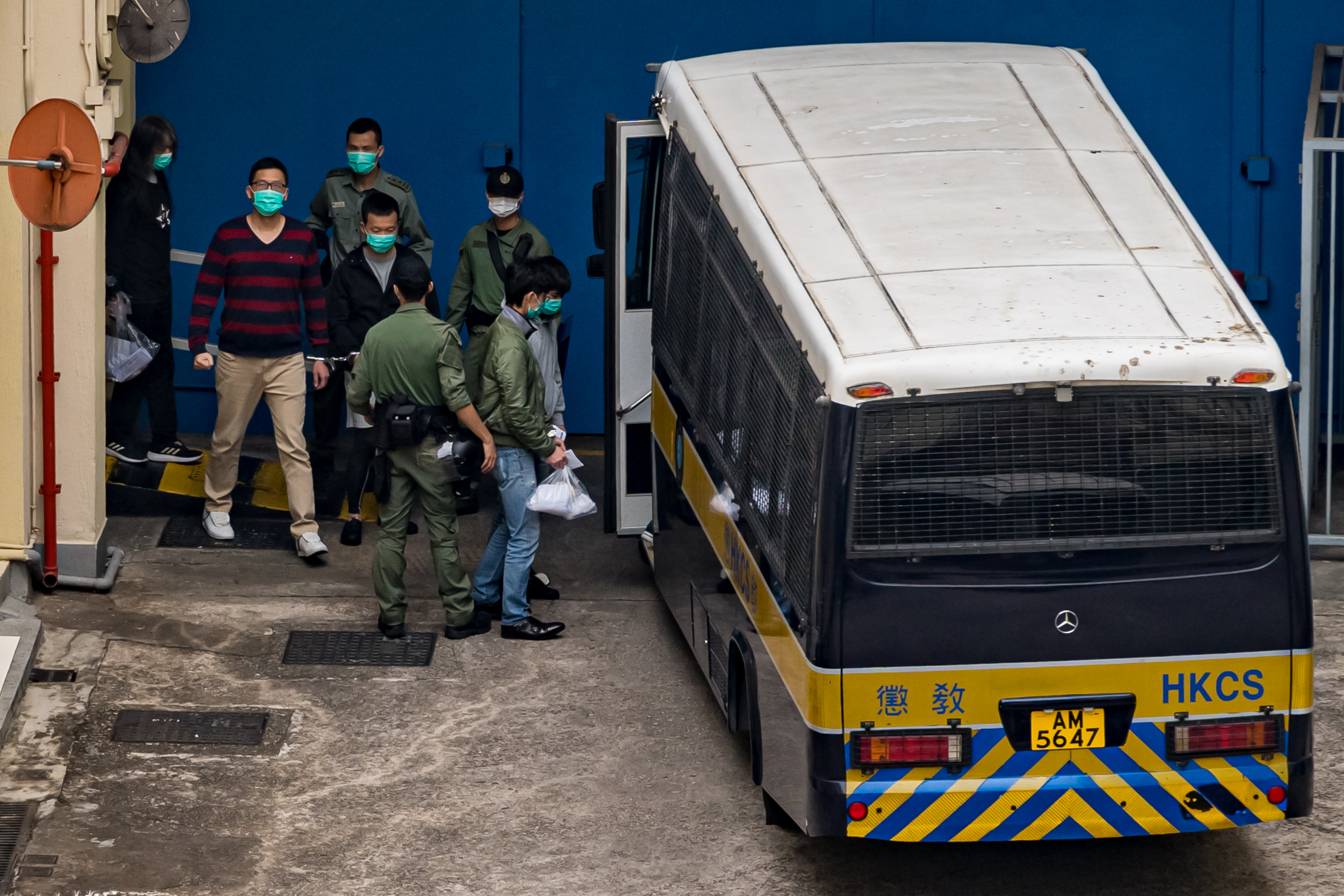
Defendants Lam Cheuk-ting and Raymond Chan at the Lai Chi Kok Reception Centre before being sent to the court

Eight defendants had not addressed the court regarding their bail applications in the more than 24-hour marathon hearing. On the third day on 3 March, 47 pro-democracy defendants have yet to submit their statements on bail. Before the trial started at 12 pm, the live broadcast system showed the problem of not being able to hear the conversation or voice in the court again, causing the family members to question the "secret interrogation." On the other hand, the live broadcasts in the press room and the auditorium both had problems with pictures and no sound, which caused the reporters on the spot to clamor. Barrister Margaret Ng said that the court has no way to control its own procedures. Do we still have judicial independence?" However, Kit Hung, the senior news director of the Judiciary, stated that no in-court voices will be played before the court session. This statement caused dissatisfaction with Figo Chan, the convener of Civil Human Rights Front.

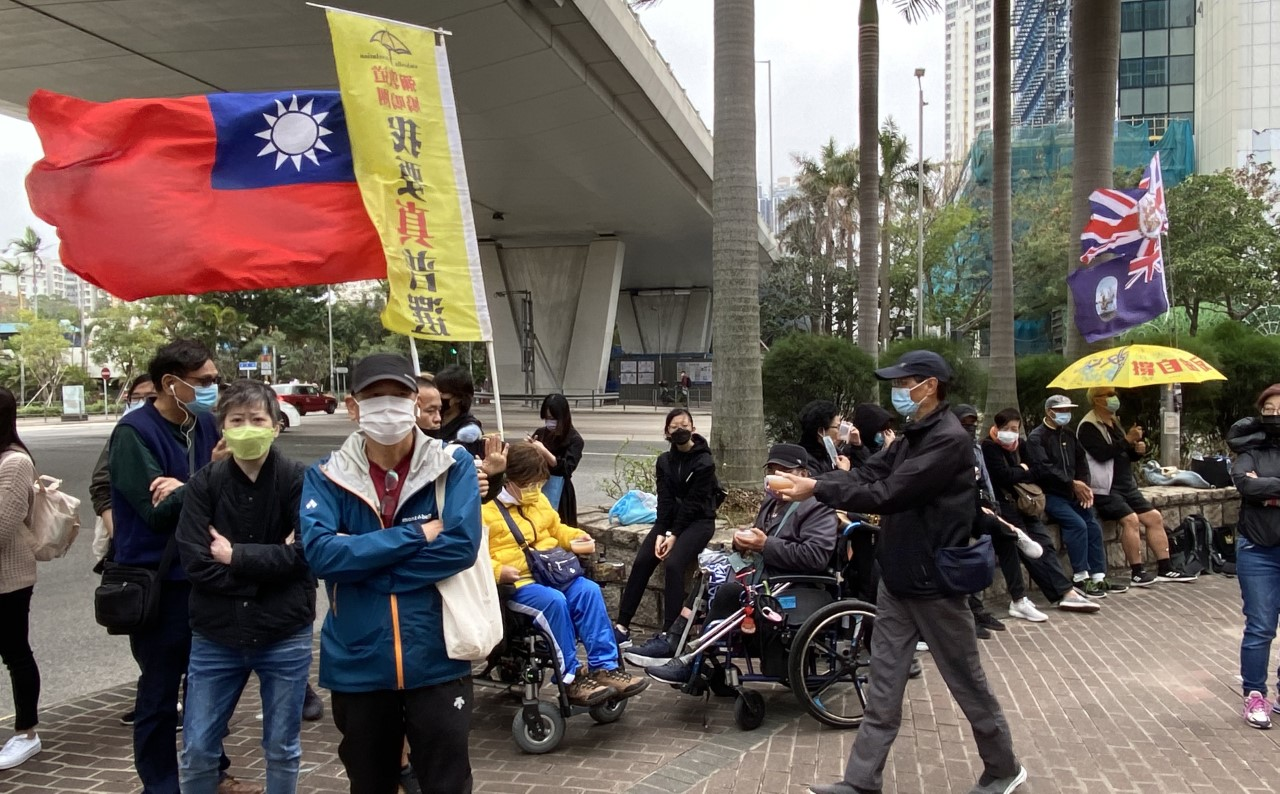
Supporters outside West Kowloon Magistrates' Court waving Taiwanese flag and colonial-era flag

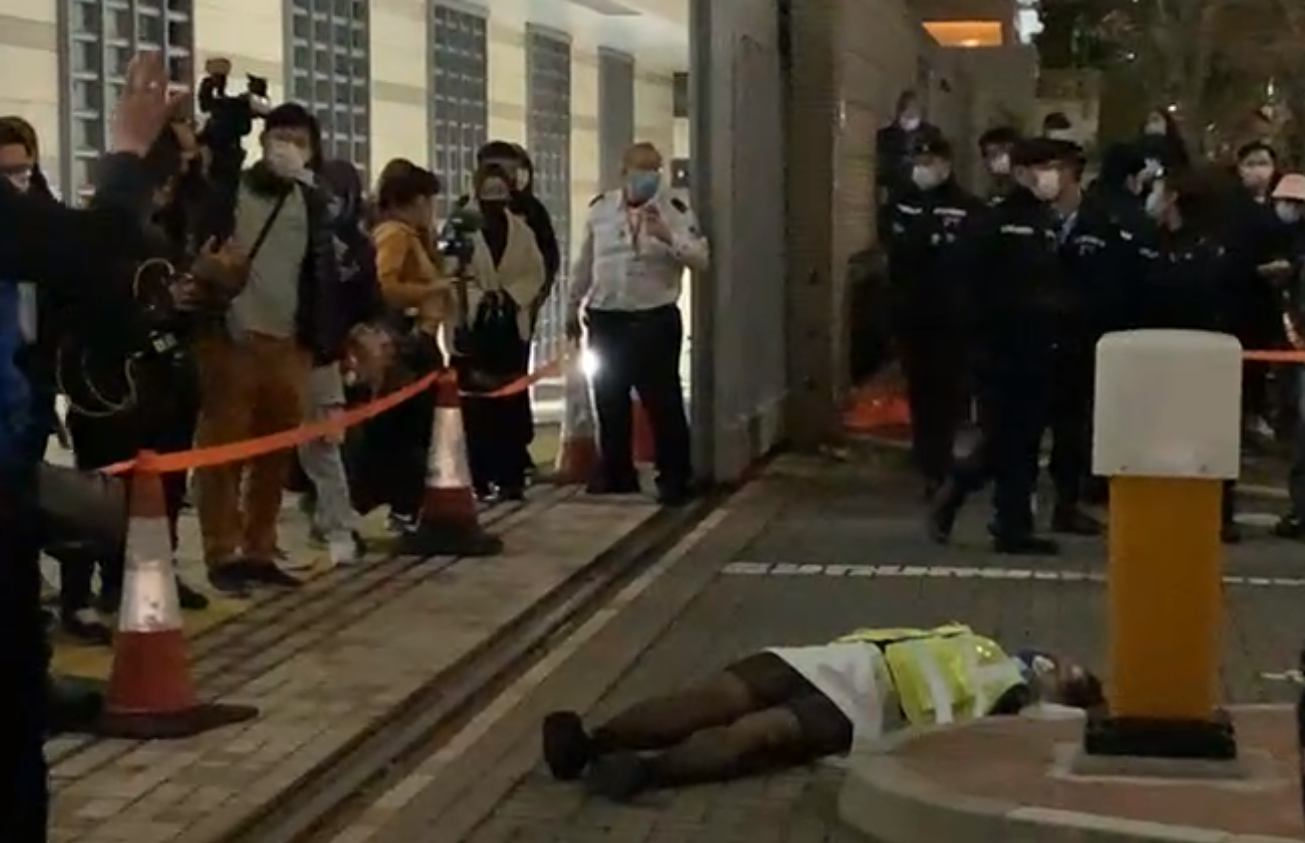
A female online media reporter in fell to the ground

At the same time, four Civic Party defendants Alvin Yeung, Kwok Ka-ki, Jeremy Tam and Lee Yue-shun announced their resignations from the party, with Yeung resigning from the party. Barrister Alan Leong, chairman of the party, terminated his legal representation of the four. Lam Cheuk-ting, Clarisse Yeung and Gwyneth Ho also told the court they had terminated the services of their legal representatives. Alvin Yeung said before addressing the court: "As a barrister, I would never have imagined that I would have to address the court in the docks. On March 2 five years ago, I was sworn in as a legislative councillor, fighting for Hongkongers, but five years later, I am fighting for my own freedom." Chief Magistrate Victor So adjourned the third day proceedings at 8:30 pm.

=== Hong Kong's degree of freedom dropped to 52 points ===
The international human rights monitoring organization Freedom House released the 2021 Global Freedom Survey Report. The total score of Hong Kong's freedom fell from last year by 3 points to 52 points. It stated that "the territory’s freedoms and autonomy have been sharply reduced in recent years amid growing political intervention from the mainland".

=== Draft amendment to the Immigration Ordinance tentatively scheduled to take effect on 1 August ===
The draft amendment to the Immigration Ordinance allows the Secretary for Security to empower the Director of Immigration and others to prohibit certain transportation vehicles from carrying certain persons, causing public concern that the provisions undermine the freedom of entry and exit of Hong Kong people. Deputy Secretary of the Security Bureau, Sonny Au, said that the relevant amendments are "very confident" that they are in line with the Basic Law and have not expanded their powers. The Security Bureau stated that if all goes well, the tentative regulations will take effect on 1 August.

=== Criminal convictions ===
A 16-year-old boy participated in a riot at the junction of Nathan Road and Shantung Street in Mong Kok on 16 November 2019; used a scarf in an unlawful assembly; attempted to damage the road with fire at the junction of Shantung Street and Portland Street on the same day as he attempted to use fire to damage the road or property belonging to the Hong Kong; and to keep a wrench. He was charged with rioting, attempted arson, possession of objects with intent to destroy or damage property, and 4 crimes of violating the Prohibition on Face Covering Regulation. The boy pleaded guilty to the first two crimes earlier, and the other two crimes were revoked by the prosecution. District Court judge Ernest Lin sentenced him to a detention centre.

== 4 March ==
=== Fourth day of 47 pro-democracy activists trial ===
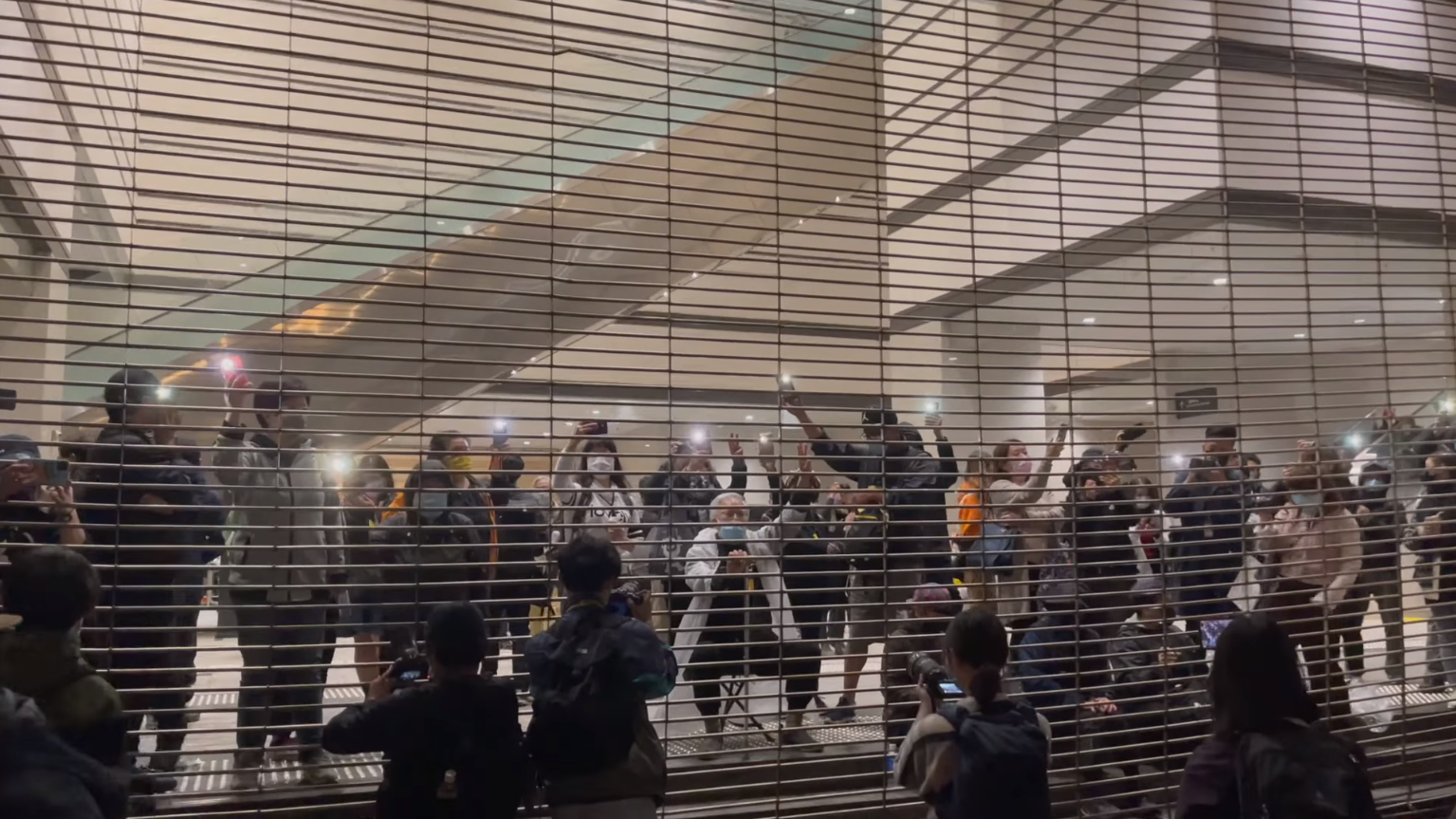
Supporters inside West Kowloon Magistrates' Courts light up their mobile phone lights

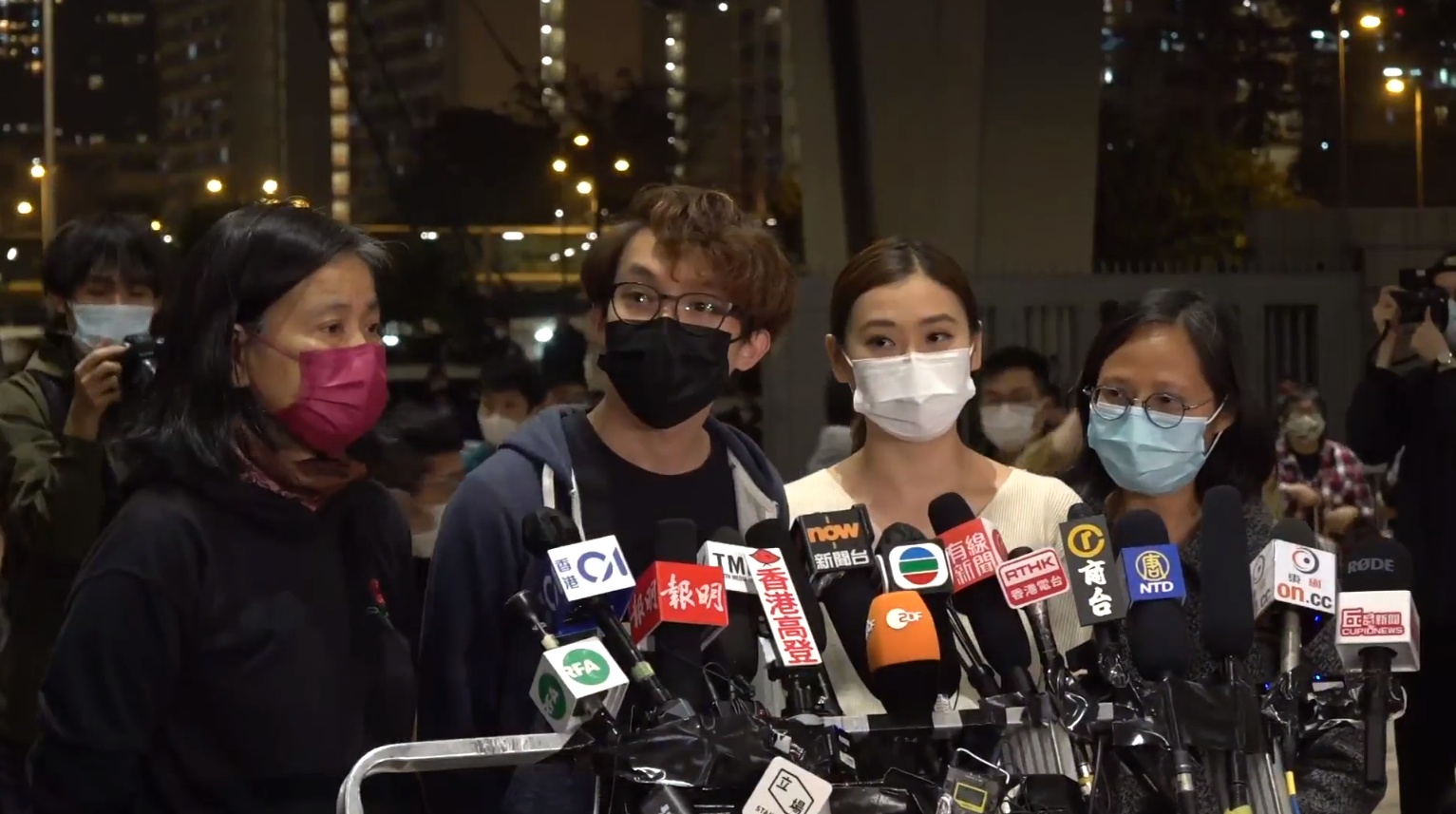
Leung Kwok-hung's wife Chan Po-ying, Figo Chan, Lester Shum's wife Nicole Alexis Yu, and Eddie Chu's wife Au Pui-fun speaking to reporters in response of the court decision

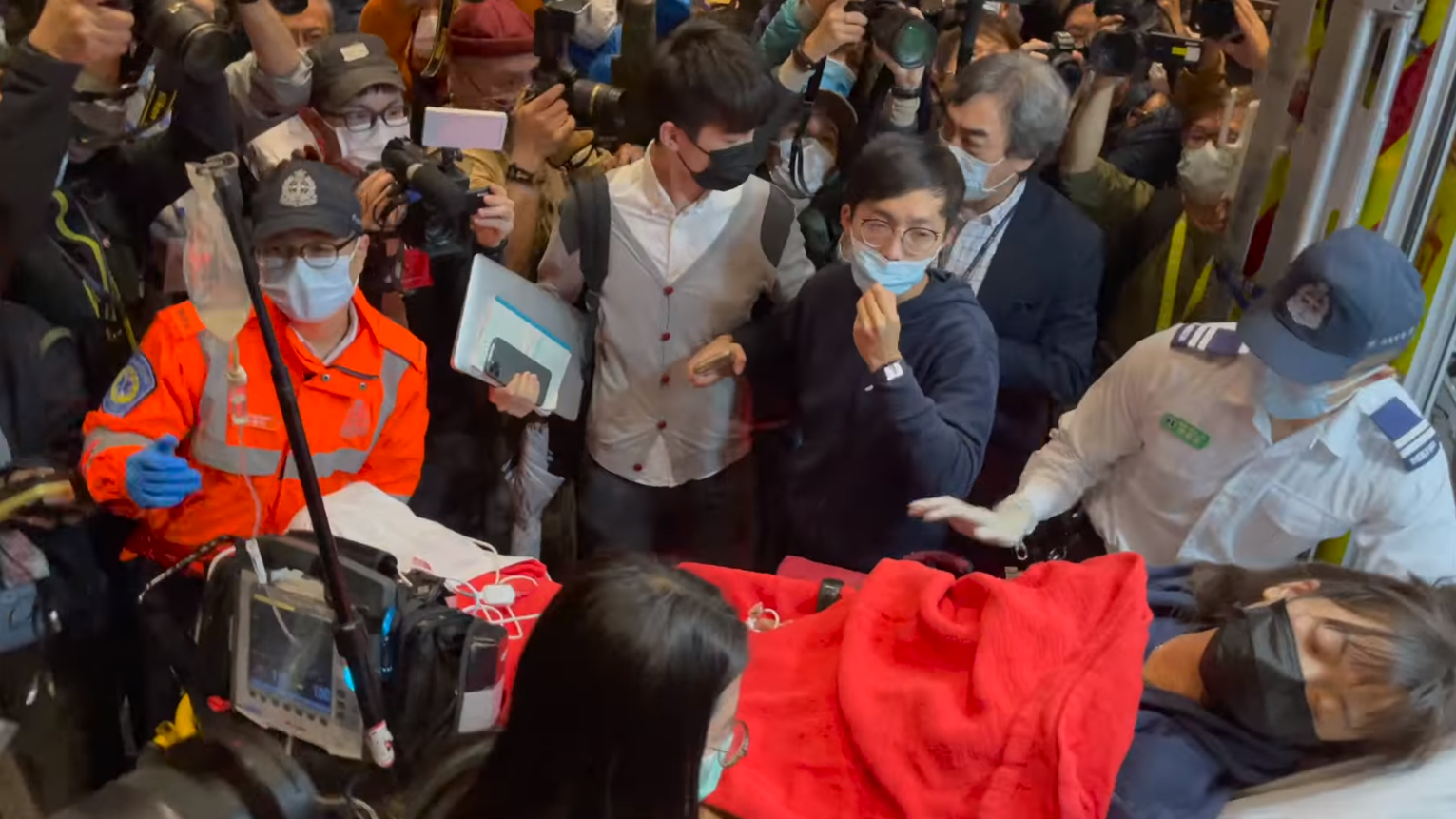
Clarisse Yeung is being brought back to the hospital

All defendants finished their addresses to the court with proceedings deep into the fourth day on 4 March. Hundreds of people queued in the rain for entering the courthouse before the proceedings until nighttime, defying police warnings of violating the national security law.

Some media outlets applied to the court for lifting reporting strict restrictions on the bail proceedings which could only report the name of the court and the magistrate of the case, the date and place of the proceedings, the name of the defendants and their legal representation, the offence they were charged of and the result of a proceedings. The defence proposed a set of relaxed reporting rules, with Barrister David Ma saying that an open, fair and transparent trial was the "cornerstone of the rule of law", pointing out that freedom of speech and the press are respected under the national security law. A representative of Senior Counsel Hectar Pun argued that "if the media cannot report on this open hearing, then it will undermine the principle of open justice." Chief Magistrate Victor So refused the plea on the grounds that the general public or the press may not be able to determine whether a statement made in court fell under the scope of "legal argument," causing citizens to accidentally breach the restrictions, which would be "a bit dangerous for them".

Chief Magistrate Victor So initially granted bail to 15 of the 47 defendants at around 8 p.m., but the decision was immediately appealed by the Department of Justice. The 32 remaining defendants were denied bail on grounds that they would be likely to continue to commit acts endangering national security, meaning they would have to be remain in detention until the trial begins on 31 May. When the defendants left the court, the supporters who waited outside waved goodbye and thanked their lawyers. Some also chanted "Five demands, not one less", "Political prisoners are not guilty" and "Hongkonger won't die."

Four of the defendants Clarisse Yeung, Lawrence Lau, Hendrick Lui and Mike Lam were released on bail on the next day after prosecutors dropped the appeal.

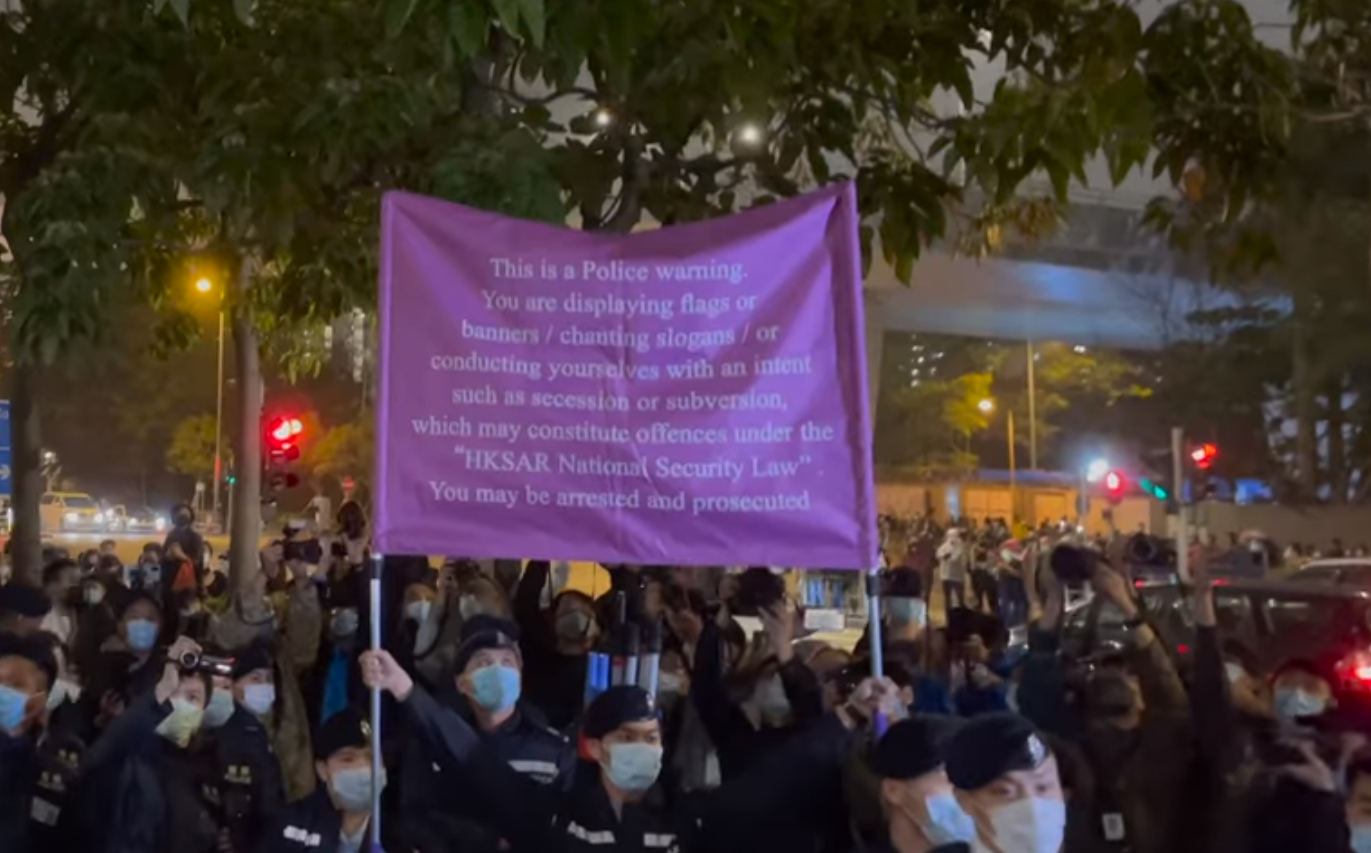
Police officers raised the purple flag after someone shouting slogans and singing was suspected of violating national security law.

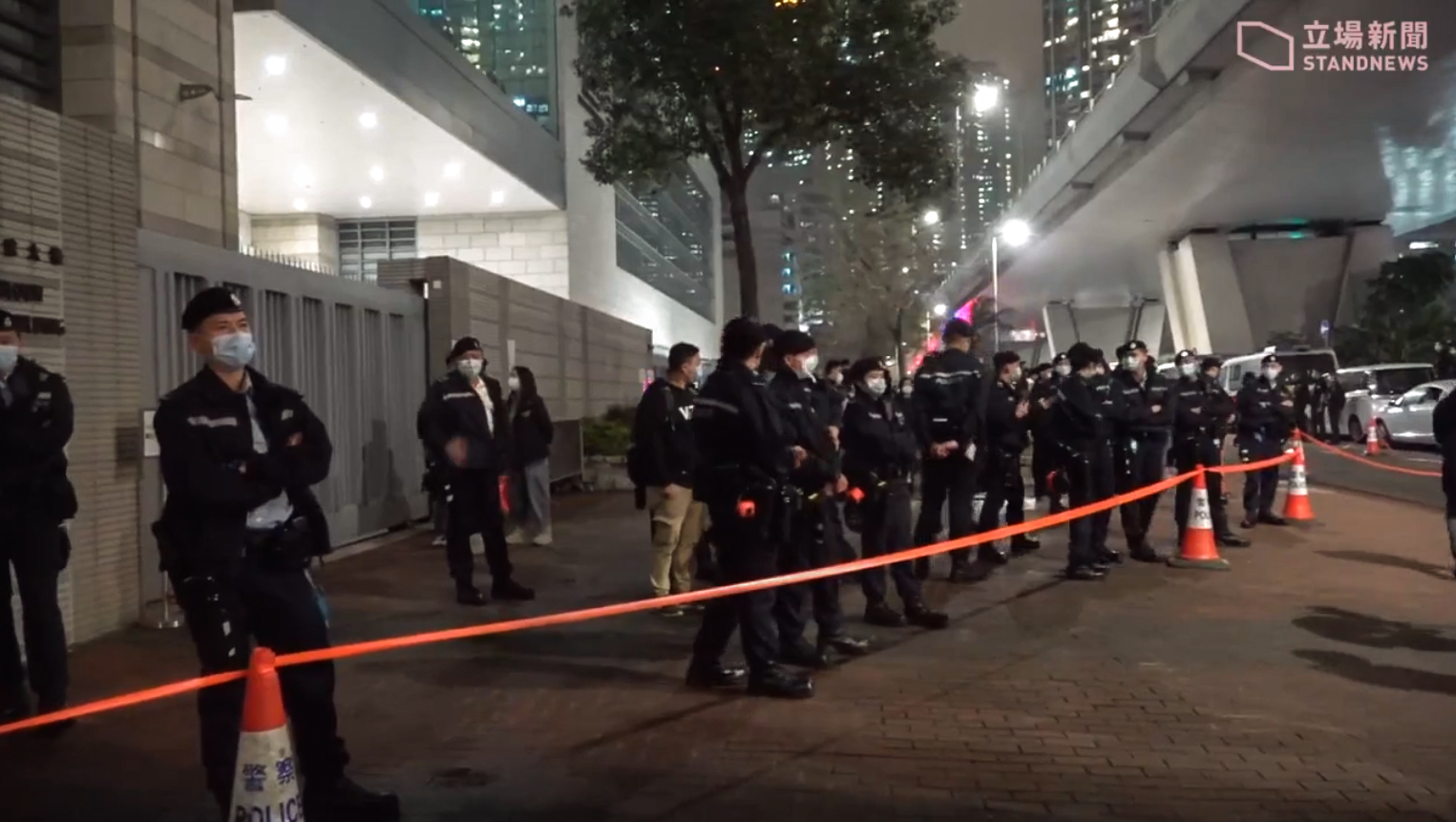
A large number of police officers are preparing to clear the scene outside the court.

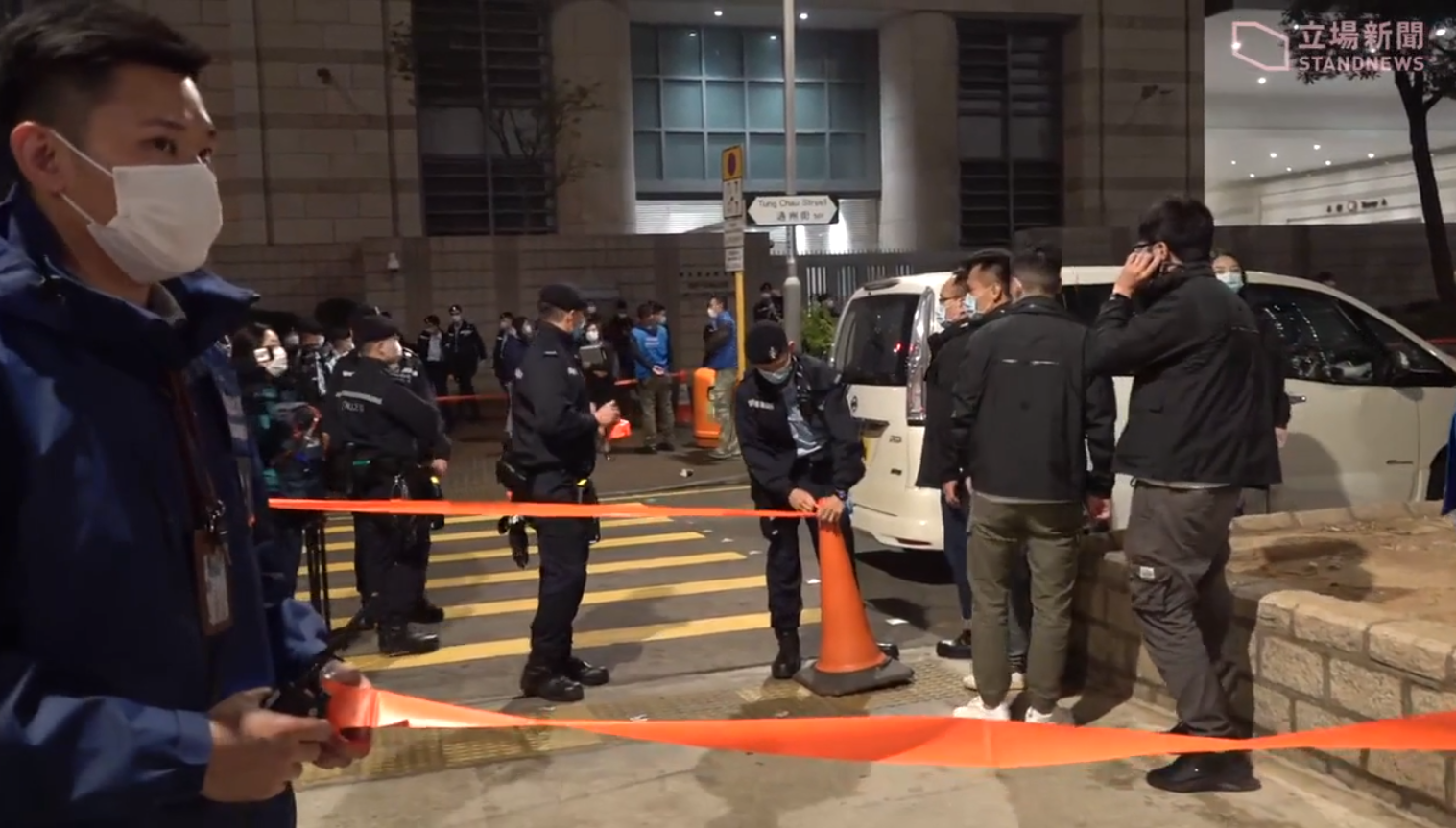
A large number of police officers pulled up the orange cordon tape and asked reporters and citizens to leave the pavement outside the court.

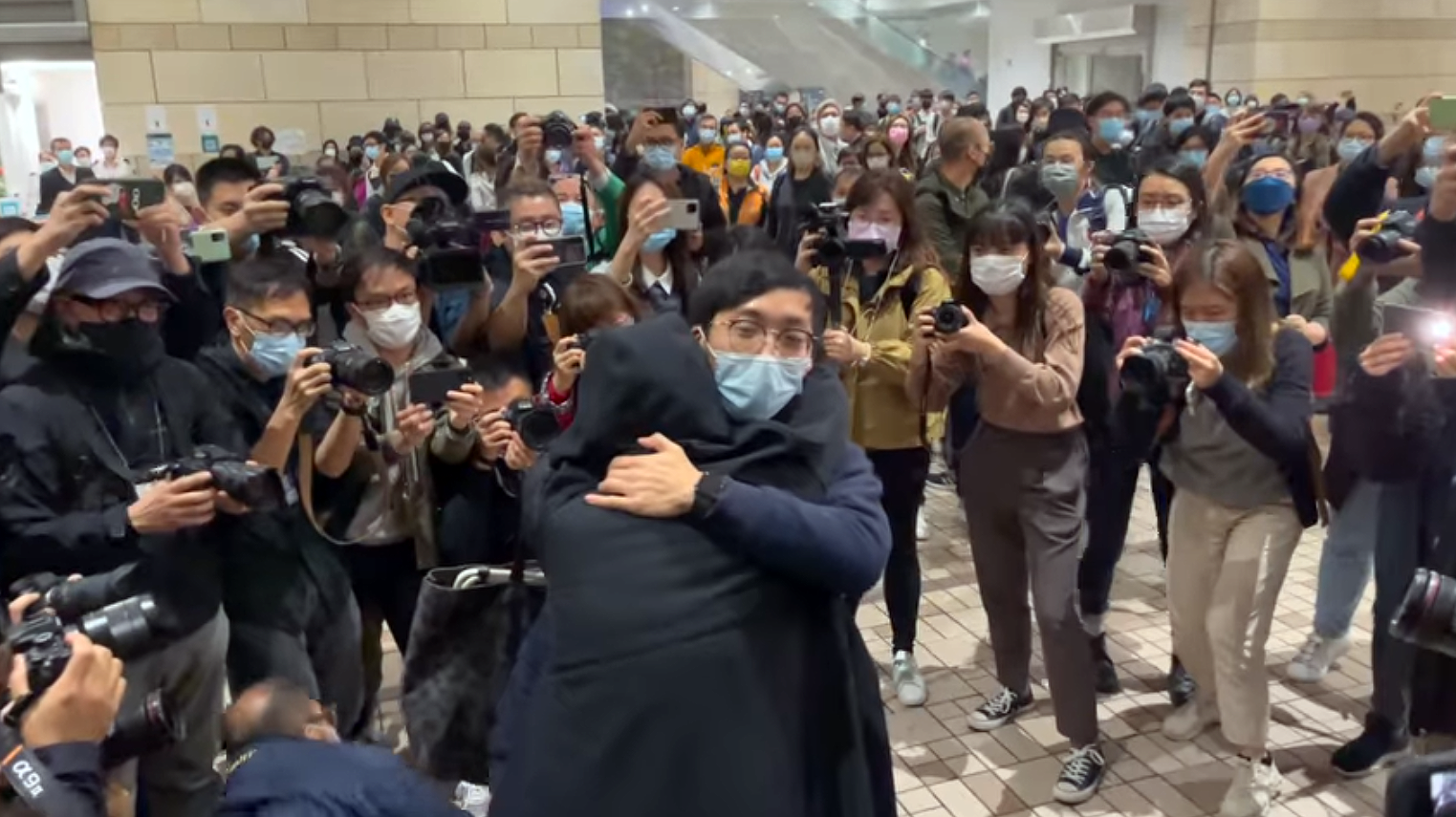
TSW Connection member Lam Chun hugs a family member of a defendant.

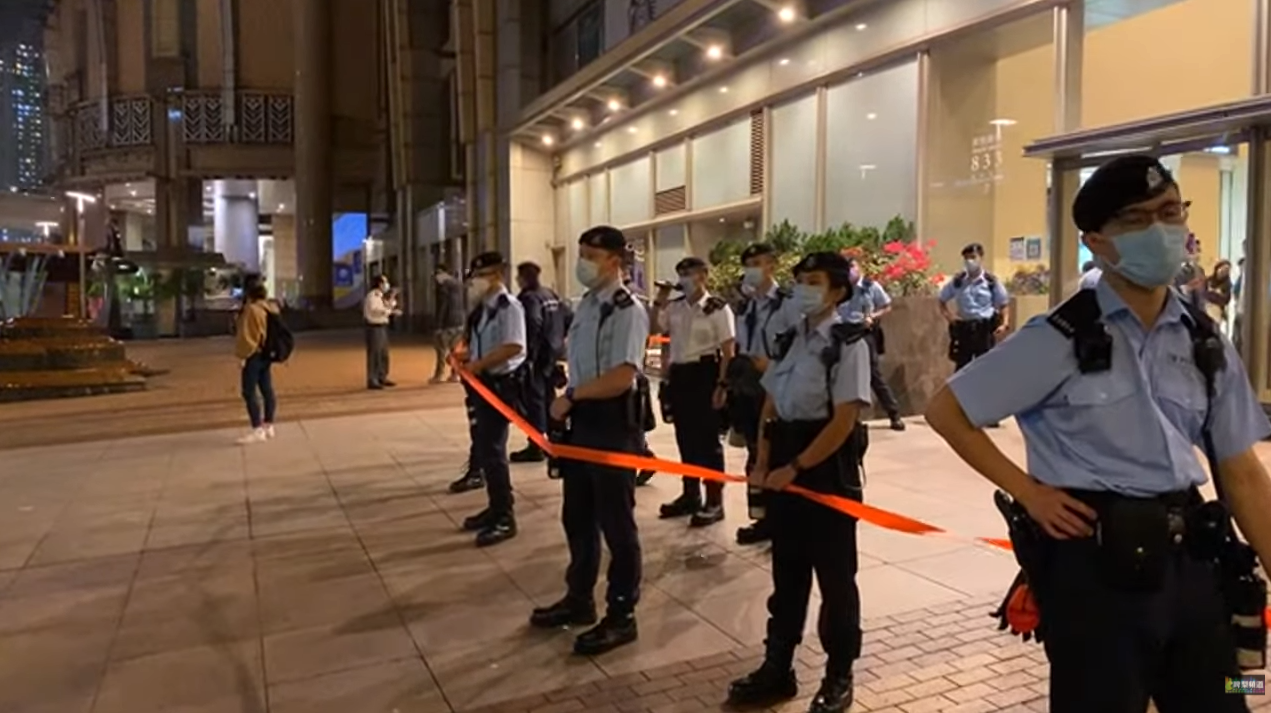
Police officers cordoned off outside Liberté, and someone was intercepted for investigation.

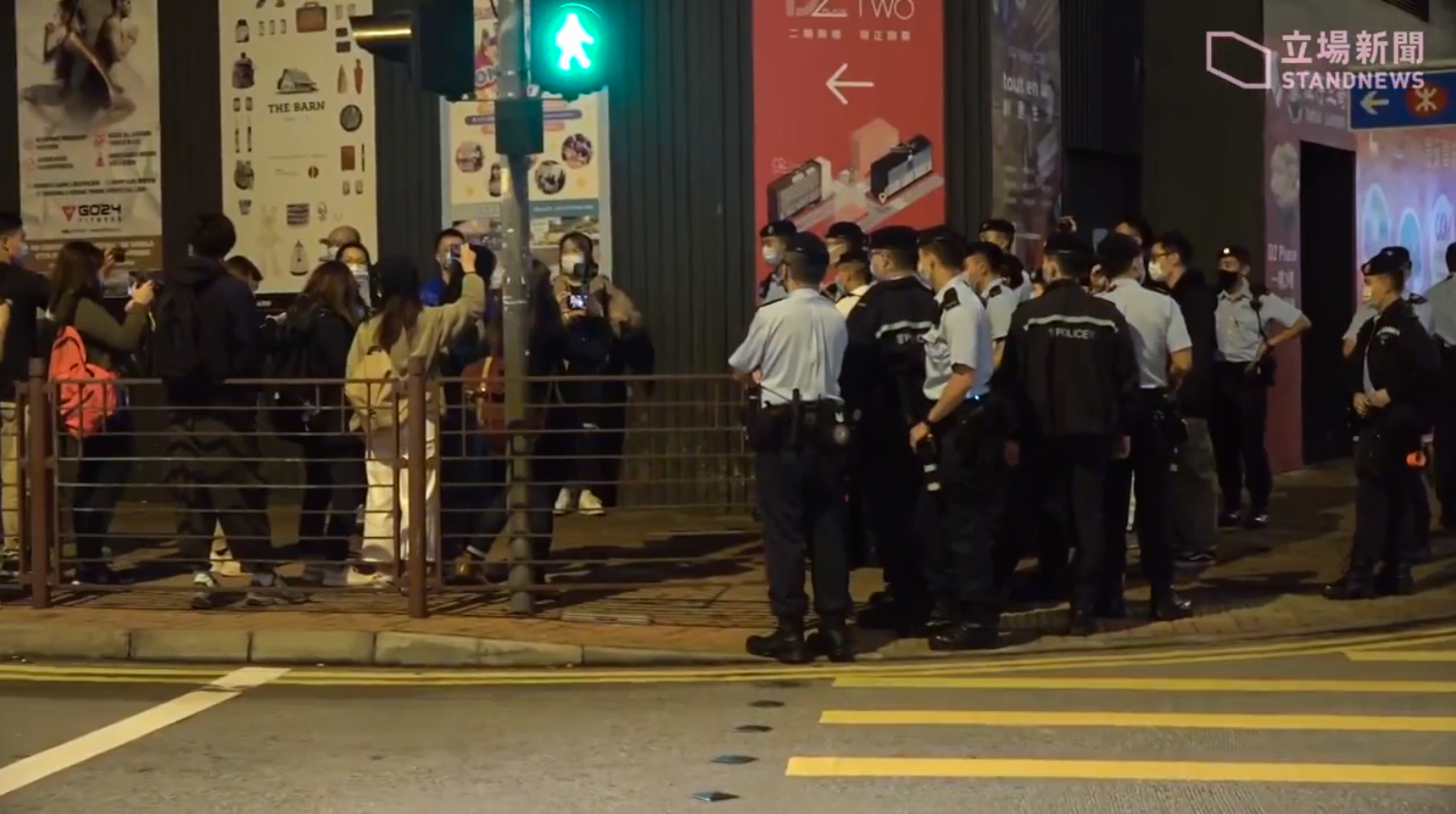
Afterwards, the police pushed the line of defense to Cheung Lai Street.

=== Hong Kong's electoral reform is on the agenda of the National People's Congress ===
In the evening of the same day, the National People's Congress held a press conference. Spokesperson Zhang Yesui answered questions from Chinese and foreign journalists on the agenda of the conference and issues related to the work of the National People's Congress. Zhang said at the meeting that the Standing Committee of the National People's Congress will review the motion of the National People's Congress on improving the Hong Kong's election system for deliberation. When a reporter from Phoenix Satellite TV asked how to modify the electoral system, Zhang pointed out that Hong Kong’s electoral system needs to be improved to provide a sound system guarantee for the comprehensive and accurate implementation of the one country, two systems policy and the full implementation of the 'patriot ruling Hong Kong' principle. Hong Kong government issued a statement stating that it respects the leadership of the central government in improving the political system and will make full cooperation.

== 5 March ==
=== Four activists released on bail ===
47 pan-democrats were charged with conspiracy to subvert state power for the pro-democracy primaries. Public Prosecutors decided not to continue the bail review process with Clarisse Yeung, Lawrence Lau, Hendrick Lui and Lam King-nam. They were taken to the West Kowloon Magistrates' Court at night, and they allowed to go out on bail under the original conditions. The bail conditions for 4 people include not directly or indirectly, in any way, making, issuing or reprinting any remarks that may have reasonable grounds to be considered endangering national security, not being allowed to leave Hong Kong, surrendering all travel documents including BNO, need to make cash and sureties, report to the designated police station several times a week, observe the curfew, not directly or indirectly organize, arrange, participate in or coordinate any level of elections (except voting), and shall not directly or indirectly communicate with any foreign officials, parliamentarians, members of parliament at any level or other persons who serve the above personnel, etc. Among them, Lam must pay HK$1 million surety.

=== Police arrested 2 men on suspicion of intimidating judicial officers ===
Hong Kong Police Cyber Security and Technology Crime Investigation Division Superintendent Wilson Tam confirmed that the police arrested 17-year-old youth and 61-year-old local man in Tseung Kwan O and Tuen Mun respectively. They were suspected of using telephone nuisances and posting threats or intimidation via social platforms to harm justice. He stated that they were arrested on suspicion of 'crimes related to telephone, message, or telegram' and 'inciting others to injure or cause serious bodily harm to others.'

=== Singaporean newspaper claims Civil Human Rights Front is being investigated or banned ===
Singaporean newspaper Lianhe Zaobao quoted a source, saying that the National Endowment for Democracy had funded Civil Human Rights Front to organize an anti-extradition bill protests, which was investigated by the Hong Kong authorities. Once this is true, the CHRF will violate the national security law or be banned by the Hong Kong government. Figo Chan issued a statement in response, stating that the CHRF has never received any foreign government or agency funding since its establishment, including the NED. After that, many members and groups withdrew from the CHRF, including Democratic Party, Hong Kong Association for Democracy and People's Livelihood, Civic Party, Neo Democrats, Justice and Peace Commission of the Hong Kong Catholic Diocese, Federation for a Democratic China and Professional Teachers' Union.

== 6 March ==
=== High Court opens a court to deal with 11 bail reviews ===
High Court opened a court session to process the bail review of the remaining 11 people. Before 8:30 am, more than 150 public gallery seats had been reserved. At 2 pm, the High Court opened a court session to deal with the review of the bail of 11 activists by the Department of Justice. Some of the citizens who had taken the audit plan sat down in the space outside the court to take a break and waited for the hearing. However, a large group of police officers suddenly pulled up an orange tape to cordon the citizens present, and issued a restricted gathering order ticket to about 30 citizens at the scene. A number of citizens who were issued with the ticket expressed strong dissatisfaction with the police actions. It is also said that it is unreasonable for the police to sue while sitting alone. Most people said they would refuse to pay fines.

The bail review case is handled by Esther Toh, a judge designated by the chief executive for handling national security law cases. She stated that she would listen to the review hearing on 11 and 13 March, handling 6 hearings every day, with 3 people each in the morning and noon. The court won't process bail applications, and everyone must to be remanded.

=== Solidarity with 47 activists rally in Canada ===
Hongkongers in both major cities in Canada initiated actions to support 47 pan-democrat activists who were charged with conspiracy to subvert state power in the pro-democracy primaries. Approximately 300 people participated in the parade in Vancouver. The demonstrators first started from the Richmond-Brighouse station and walked along Route 3 to the Brighouse Station Park. Many passing cars have horn support. In Toronto, Joseph Tay called on local Hong Kong people to carry out signature and fundraising activities with Drive Thru flow arrangement. Although the local gathering order is limited, and the temperature is only minus 15 degrees. However, there were still 205 vehicles participating in the two-hour event, and a total of 509 signatures and $135,000 in charity were collected, which will be used as attorney fees.

== 7 March ==
=== Five major cities in North America held a parade to support Hong Kong ===
Hong Kong residents living in North America held rallies or demonstrations in New York City, San Francisco, Los Angeles, Seattle, and Vancouver to support those in Hong Kong. The Vancouver Stake held a pop-up rally in front of the Chinese Consulate on Granville Street in Vancouver. In the United States, a number of New York human rights organizations held an event in Times Square to support and call on the outside world to pay attention to Hong Kong issues.

== 10 March ==
=== Ted Hui arrives in Australia ===
Ted Hui, a former pan-democratic legislator who was wanted by the Hong Kong police for violating the national security law and other crimes, moved from the United Kingdom to Australia and began to undergo a 14-day compulsory quarantine. In an interview with SBS, he said that he believes that Europe and Canada already have politicians who are internationally lobbying, but Australia is lacking, so he will lobby for work there, hoping that local members of parliament and officials can see what is happening in Hong Kong. He also revealed that the lobbying work has three major goals, including promoting human rights legislation, encouraging Australia's economy and trade to reduce dependence on Beijing, and expanding measures to accommodate Hong Kong people. He also thanked the Australian government for its help. Under the current "sealing" of foreigners, he was able to make an exception to allow him to board flights that only take Australian citizens at his own expense.

=== Nathan Law attends the hearing of the Foreign Relations Committee of the U.S. Senate ===
Wanted by the Hong Kong police and now in exile in the United Kingdom, Nathan Law attended the Democracy Around the World hearing of the U.S. Senate Foreign Relations Committee. He pointed out that the Hong Kong national security law has become a convenient tool. Recently 47 democrats have participated. In the primary election, they was charged with "conspiracy to subvert state power" and the freedom of Hong Kong was eroded. And Beijing's decision to "perfect" Hong Kong's electoral system, he described as actually turning Hong Kong's parliament into a "rubber stamp" like the mainland's "People's Congress," making "elections" reduced to "choices." He urged the United States to increase sanctions not only for officials, but also for companies. He also urged that at the Democracy Summit held in April, some democratic countries, such as the G7 and European countries, can propose to defend the Global Democratic Alliance. Finally, he concluded his speech with Cantonese "Liberate Hong Kong, Revolution of Our Times!"

=== Helena Wong released on bail from the High Court, Ng Kin-wai bail denied ===
The High Court rejected the application for review by the Department of Justice and upheld the original verdict. Democratic Party member, Helena Wong, was released on bail under the original conditions, but Ng Kin-wai must continue to be remanded. She left the court and said, "Everyone, hold on, see you in 10 years." After chanting the slogan "May my life be true", the people in the court responded with "Defend my city." Ng shouted "All people help themselves," and the masses responded with "breaking fate."

== 12 March ==
=== 21 people denied bail and remanded in custody ===
Among them, 21 defendants who were not released on bail exercised their right to review bail every 8 days and went to the West Kowloon Magistrates' Court to review the bail with the designated judge and chief magistrate of the national security law. However, eight of them waived the right to review bail every eight days with the magistrate on the same day. The court also refused bail for some people, including Tiffany Yuen, and all of them continued to be remanded.

=== EU publishes annual Hong Kong report, SAR government opposes ===
On 12 March, European Union issued its annual Hong Kong report. The European Union’s High Representative for Foreign and Security Policy, Josep Borrell, said that in 2020, the political situation in Hong Kong has witnessed an alarming deterioration and severe erosion. "Used to combat democratic forces, suppress dissent and pluralistic voices. In addition, in January this year, 47 pro-democracy activists were arrested for participating in the primary election, confirming that the trend is accelerating. It reflects that China has consciously undermined the principle of "one country, two systems" and violated its international commitments and the Basic Law. SAR government issued a statement late at night, expressing its strong opposition to the content of the report, believing that it was biased and unreasonable political smear. Alleging that the EU's attack on the national security law is obviously a double standard.

== 13 March ==
=== High Court handles bail review on 5 people ===
On March 13, 2021, High Court appointed judge Esther Toh handles the bail review of five of them. Former Civic Party members Jeremy Tam and Kwok Ka-ki refused to be released on bail, and they must continue to wait for information. Former Civic Party member Cheng Tat-hung, Sai Kung District Councillor Ricky Or and Southern District Councillor Michael Pang approved bail with cash guarantee of HK$50,000-100,000 and sureties of HK$100,000-300,000. Among them, Cheng was granted bail with a cash guarantee of HK$100,000 and a surety of HK$1 million. The bail conditions include not directly or indirectly organizing, arranging, participating in or coordinating elections at any level, surrendering all travel documents, including British National (Overseas) passport; complying with the curfew, reporting to the police station four times a week; not making possible Words and deeds regarded as endangering national security, etc.

=== G7 foreign ministers concerned about Hong Kong's reform of the electoral system ===
British Foreign Minister Dominic Raab, Foreign Ministers of the Group of Seven (G7), and the governments of Australia and New Zealand issued separate statements expressing concern about China's revision of Hong Kong's electoral system, believing that the authorities are determined to eliminate dissident voices and opinions in Hong Kong. Among them, Raab stated that China had violated the Sino-British Joint Declaration for the third time in less than 9 months, referring to Beijing's extreme changes to the Hong Kong electoral system.

== 14 March ==
=== Carrying 'Liberate' card delivery man was accused of assaulting the police ===
In early January, a Foodpanda delivery man was intercepted by several uniformed police officers in the park outside Kingswood Ginza, Tin Shui Wai, and later found that there was a card with the word "Liberate' in the wallet, which caused the police officers to question him in a bad manner. The victim was arrested on suspicion of stealing insulated takeaway bags and attacking police with the head in the police station. The victim revealed that when he reported to the Tin Shui Wai Police Station, the police charged him with assaulting the police. The case was scheduled to appear in the Tuen Mun Magistrates' Court on 15 April. He criticized police officers for indiscriminate arrests and arrested them for unwarranted reasons.

=== Hong Kong exiles launch the 2021 Hong Kong Charter ===
Former members of the Hong Kong Legislative Council, Nathan Law, Ted Hui and Baggio Leung, as well as democrats/indigenous figures Sunny Cheung, Ray Wong, Brian Leung, Glacier Kwong and Alex Chow, held an online press conference and decided to jointly launch the 2021 Hong Kong Charter, in hope to unite the convictions of the separated Hong Kong people, gather the strength of the Hong Kong people on the international front, record the voice of Hong Kong people, and call on the international community to resist the expansion of the CCP’s authority. The promoters also stated that they will not conduct any activities in a group manner.

== 15 March ==
=== Sentencing of a University of Hong Kong graduate ===
A graduate of the University of Hong Kong was charged with biting a police officer’s finger during a clash at Sha Tin’s New Town Plaza on 14 July 2019. He was subsequently charged with assaulting a police officer, causing serious bodily harm to others, intentionally wounding others, and disrupting public order. Judge Jonathan Chan of West Kowloon Court said that the two police officers who were attacked were performing their duties properly. He said that the defendant carried out the attack because the other party was a police officer, and the act was very cruel, causing serious harm to the police officer and was sentenced to deterrent penalties. In the end, the defendant was sentenced to five and a half years in prison for four crimes, which is the most severely sentenced case in the anti-amendment campaign. Many people out of court cried bitterly after hearing the verdict, and they needed to be comforted by others.

=== Golden Scene Cinema cancels screening of PolyU Siege documentary movie ===
Golden Scene Cinema announced on its Facebook page that the screening of the movie Inside the Red Brick Wall, which shows the documentary of PolyU siege, has received excessive attention recently. In order to avoid unnecessary misunderstandings, the original screening will be cancelled. The company regrets this and hopes the audience will understand and will arrange a refund.

== 16 March ==
=== IPCC: police received nearly 2,000 complaints about the protests, 6 cases were proved to be true ===
On a meeting held by IPCC, the police explained that as of 5 March this year, a total of 1,950 complaints have been received regarding the anti-amendment campaign, of which 621 were required to report complaints. Nearly four of them have become serious allegations, including abuse of power (121 cases) and assault. (112 cases), intimidation (12 cases) and 2 cases of fabricated evidence. Acting Secretary-General of the Police Supervision Commission Daniel Mui revealed that six complaints have been proven to be true, and the relevant police officers are punished as 'instructions.'

=== The make-up screening of Inside the Red Brick Wall at the Art Center canceled suddenly ===
Following the Golden Scene Cinema, the Hong Kong Arts Center's three-day make-up screening of Inside the Red Brick Wall, which was originally scheduled to be held from 16 to 18, was also temporarily cancelled. The Art Center refers to it as "a very difficult decision" and hopes that all parties will understand and tolerate it.

== 17 March ==
=== Hong Kong's academic freedom index plummeted ===
Global Public Policy Institute announced the Global Academic Freedom Index ratings. The report stated that Hong Kong was awarded a D-level due to the implementation of the national security law, which has greatly increased the pressure on the higher education sector, which is equivalent to Uganda, Russia, and Cambodia. Education Bureau responded that academic freedom is protected by the Basic Law.

=== M+ exhibits suspected in violation of national security law ===
Chief Executive Carrie Lam attended the Legislative Council for questioning. New People's Party member Eunice Yung pointed out that some exhibits at the West Kowloon Cultural District, such as Ai Weiwei's "Perspective Study: Tiananmen", disseminated suspected violations of national security laws and "insulting national dignity." She asked the government to set up a department to examine whether the exhibits violated the National Security Law and the Basic Law. At the same time, she asked to prevent exhibits with hatred from being put on the shelves. Chief Executive stated that "all Hong Kong compatriots must support and maintain national security" and will be "particularly vigilant" about related matters. M+ Museum stated that it will adhere to the principle of rigorous academic spirit, and abide by the laws of Hong Kong, and "uphold the highest professional ethics."

=== Wen Wei Po and Ta Kung Pao criticized ADC ===
Pro-Beijing leftist newspapers Wen Wei Po and Ta Kung Pao criticized the Arts Development Council for funding a number of art groups to carry out creations related to the anti-government movement, saying that "the ADC has funded black storm films" and "The ADC has become "pornographic films" in disguise. "Golden Master" reported that the naming of multiple art groups at the same time, including the light and shadow workshop, the muddled troupe, the Tianbianwai theater, the Tongliu theater, and the Hong Kong Literary Life Museum, violated the National Security Law. In the evening, the ADC issued a statement in response, stating that it will regularly send letters to remind all funded arts groups to abide by the laws of Hong Kong and other contractual terms. In case of breach of contract, including the determination to promote Hong Kong independence and overthrow the government, the bureau has the right to suspend, adjust and stop appropriations.

=== District Councillors must take oath to SAR ===
Hong Kong Legislative Council will deliberate the Public Service (Election and Appointment) (Miscellaneous Amendments) Bill 2021. The draft regulates the swearing and disqualification of public officials (including district councilors and judicial officers).

=== U.S. imposes financial sanctions on Chinese and Hong Kong officials ===
On 17 March, the U.S. Department of State announced financial sanctions on 24 Chinese and Hong Kong officials. Chinese Foreign Ministry spokesperson Zhao Lijian said that the 14 Chinese officials who had previously imposed travel restrictions have imposed further financial sanctions to take necessary countermeasures. A spokesperson for the Hong Kong government expressed extreme disappointment, saying that the Chief Executive and other sanctioned SAR officials "are not afraid of hostile hegemonic acts by the United States, and they will continue to perform their duties of safeguarding "One Country, Two Systems" and national security in Hong Kong without fear."

== 21 March ==
=== 20 police officers arrived at the scene on 20 months since Yuen Long attack ===
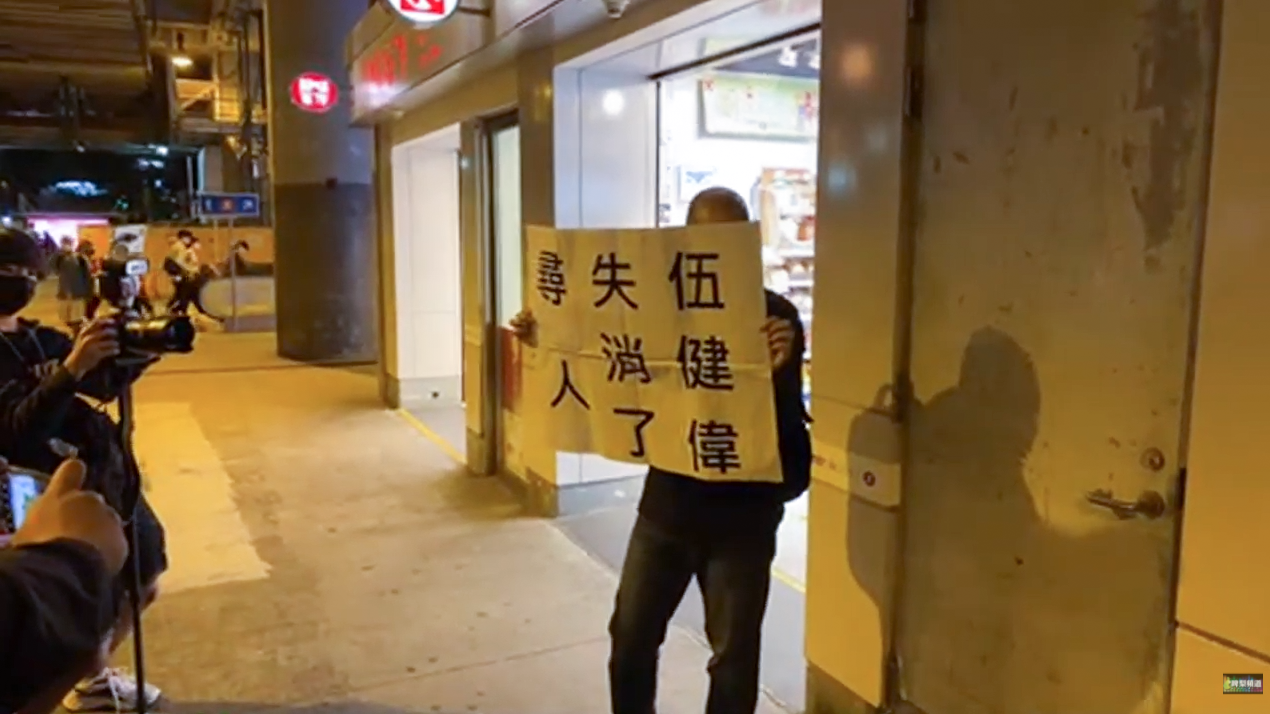
A man held a placard 'Ng Kin-wai still missing'

Twenty months after the Yuen Long attack occurred, at least 30 police officers continued to be on guard at the Yuen Long station Ground Transportation Interchange, and no one gathered. During the period, a man arrived at the scene with a slogan 'Ng Kin-wai was missing', and soon left by himself.

== 22 March ==
=== 12 activists returned to Hong Kong ===
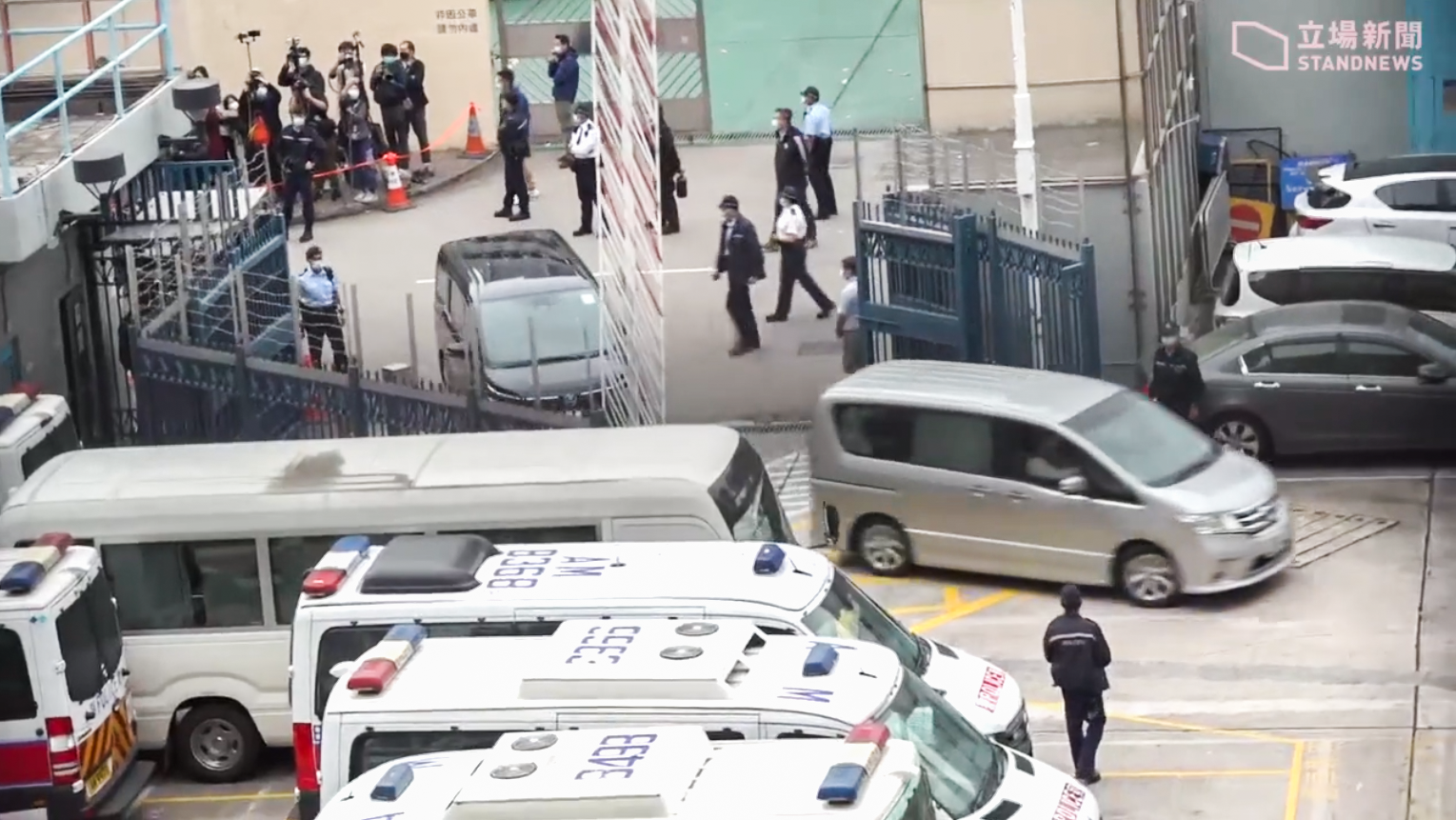
The returned activists covered their head with a black cloth and was taken to the Tin Shui Wai Police Station in 4 batches in a seven-person car or a private car

In the case of 12 Hong Kong activists, 10 people were sentenced to 7 months to 3 years in prison in Shenzhen. 8 of them, Andy Li, Cheung chun-fu, Cheung Ming-yu, Yim Man-him, Li Tsz-yin, Kok Tse-lun, Cheng Tsz-ho and Wong Wai-yin, served their sentences today. They were transferred back to Hong Kong by the Shenzhen police in four batches from the Shenzhen Bay Port, and were taken to the Tin Shui Wai Police Station, and then escorted to the police station of their respective cases. The police in Yantian District, Shenzhen reported on the same day that 8 people had been released after serving their sentences on 22 March and were deported from the country. The news stated that 7 of them were not involved in violating the national security law and the National Security Department would not deal with them. Part of the cases involved in each of them will be scheduled until 2023, and there is a good chance that they will be detained for a long time and cannot be released on bail. Senior Superintendent of the National Security Department of the police, Li Kwai-wah, appeared at the Tin Shui Wai Police Station. The family members who were waiting outside the police station in the morning were disappointed that they had not been notified of the arrangement by the police and could only wait for news nearby. Among them, Li Tsz-yin's aunt shouted to the police station, "Auntie is so good to hang you", "You have to be good," etc., and then wept in tears. The family of one of the parties expressed their worries about their relatives. Hong Kong barrister and Stake Vice Chairman Chow Hang-tung, who assisted the families of 12 Hong Kong activists, said that the family members were anxious and did not respond from morning to evening. She stated that only one suspect had called his family members, and no lawyer was able to reach 8 people. She believed that the suspect had the right to see a lawyer and contact his family.

=== Judge ruled Yuen Long attack defendants had a case to answer ===
After 20 days of trial in the Yuen Long attack on 21 July 2019, District Court judge Eddie Yip ruled that the six defendants had a case to answer in relation to the charges, dismissing the request of the barrister of one of the six to have him cleared due to doubts whether the true person had been caught on video on the day of the attack. The six were each charged with one count of rioting, and with one exception, one count of wounding with intent.

=== Nine people involved in supporting PolyU siege rearrested ===
Organized Crime and Triad Investigation Division of the Hong Kong Police arrested three men and six women who were refusing bail pending further investigation. They were accused of supporting people in the Polytechnic University outside the Science Museum Square during the siege at the Hong Kong Polytechnic University on 18 November 2019. Umbrella Array confronted the police and was later surrounded and arrested by police officers. Together with a 28-year-old woman who was on bail pending further investigation, they were charged with one count of unlawful assembly. The case will appear in Kowloon City Magistrates' Courts on 26 March. According to the Apple Daily report, those who left the PolyU campus voluntarily on the day of registration will “never lose all the prizes.” The police internally described it as a marathon after the fall. People under the age of 18 who have been identified by police officers may face prosecution.

== 24 March ==
=== Jimmy Sham reviews the police's decision to use tear gas on 12 June ===
Jimmy Sham, who was remanded after charged under the national security law, the convener of the Civil Human Rights Front at the time, and a citizen who participated in a rally outside the CITIC Tower filed a judicial review on the Admiralty clash on 12 June 2019, requesting the court to rule that the police used tear gas on that day to violate the Basic Law to protect the freedom of assembly and demonstration, and the provisions in the Bill of Rights Ordinance that no torture is allowed. High Court issued a verdict that the police’s decision to release tear gas on that day was reasonably arguable and there was a reasonable chance of winning the case. However, the judge considered the case to be controversial and required them to continue the litigation in accordance with the Rules of the High Court within 14 days and change to other civil litigation methods.

=== Andy Li charged under National Security Law ===
Two days after the Hong Kong Story member Andy Li was detained by the police, he was charged with three counts, including conspiracy to collude with foreign powers or foreign powers to endanger national security under the Hong Kong national security law, conspiracy to assist crimes and unlicensed possession. The case of ammunition crime was brought to the West Kowloon Magistrates' Court on the same day. The case alleged that he had conspired with Jimmy Lai, Mark Simon, Chan Tsz-wah, Finn Lau and others in Hong Kong between 1 July 2020 and 15 February 2021 to request foreign or overseas institutions, organizations, and personnel to implement Impose sanctions, blockades, or take other hostile actions against the Hong Kong or Chinese government. At the same time, 232 used tear gas bombs, 7 used molotov bombs, and 38 used rubber bullets were found in his Sha Tin flat. However, because Li is undergoing compulsory quarantine, there is no legal representative to answer the call or family members to attend. The case was postponed until 31 March.

=== Choy Yuk-ling documentary on Yuen Long attacks ruled to be a case to hear ===
Bao Choy, freelance producer for the RTHK program Hong Kong Connection, appeared in West Kowloon Magistrates' Court under accusation of making false statements during the production of the program 7.21: Who Owns the Truth, which questioned police action during the Yuen Long 721 incident. RTHK Programme Staff Union members came to court to support. Choy stood accused of making two false statements in relation to searching online for vehicle licence plate information. In the submission by defence, the representative of Choy pointed out that she had wanted to identify vehicles which transported suspected attackers on that day. Therefore, it was a traffic matter. The prosecution claimed that the interviews and reports were not transportation matters. At the same time, they believed that the owner's information was private and that the owner had a reasonable expectation that the information would not be used by the media for purposes not related to transportation. Chief Magistrate Ivy Chui ruled that prima facie evidence had been established, and that therefore there was a case to hear.

== 25 March ==
=== Andy Li's whereabouts have been unknown for 4 days since returning to Hong Kong ===
The 12 Hong Kong People's Concern Group revealed that Andy Li, who was accused of conspiracy to collude with foreign countries or foreign forces to endanger national security, has returned to Hong Kong for four days and his whereabouts are still unknown. His family had inquired with the Correctional Services Department and the police, but the Correctional Services Department said there was no such person, and the police said that they did not know the location of Li. Correctional Services Department replied to the media that it would not comment on individual cases, and would only ask persons in custody whether they need assistance in informing their relatives and friends of the detention place in accordance with established procedures.

=== Court of Appeal ruled that joint enterprise for unlawful assembly and riot case are guilty ===
Court of Appeal clarified the legal point of view on the Sheung Wan conflict case on 28 July 2019, and ruled that the riots and illegal assembly were not at the scene, and there is a chance of being convicted. The court ruled that the principle of joint enterprise is applicable to illegal assembly and riot crimes. Even if the offender is not at the scene, they may possibly still be convicted. The court issued a written judgment that listed some examples that are at risk of being charged, including "mastermind" and commander overseas, providing money or materials to illegal assembly or riot cases/persons, providing weapons or gas masks, encouraging or using telephone or social media. Propaganda, online, or outside demonstrations use the status of sentry to remind the police to advance or mobilize; and provide drivers for vehicles to leave the scene of illegal assembly or riots, etc. Describe these roles as a concerted effort with the principal, who has the same guilt as the principal. If the principle of "collaborating in crime" is eliminated, there will be significant loopholes, and they will not be held responsible.

Court of Appeal also pointed out that when the demonstration site becomes an illegal assembly or riot, peaceful demonstrators or passers-by should leave the scene as soon as possible. If there are reasonable grounds or the environment does not allow it, pure presence is not enough to constitute an offence. However, if they participates in acts of violence or threatens violence, he will go beyond the legal protection of legal demonstrations, stating that "they is no longer a peaceful demonstrator, passing by, or bystander, but needs to be held responsible for the crime." The verdict also pointed out that freedom of speech is not absolute. To refute the defense's worries that it would be guilty to leave messages, spread messages, and like sharing on any platform. Point out that if there is sufficient evidence, they are accomplices or joint offenders.

A barrister who did not want to be named said that the relevant legal opinions will give the police a great opportunity to arrest more absentees. At the same time, he pointed out that there were a lot of gray areas in the judgment, and I was very worried.

== 29 March ==
=== Andy Li's whereabouts revealed ===
In the case of 12 Hong Kong residents, Andy Li's whereabouts were unknown for a week. Apple Daily reported that he is being returned to the highly-defense Siu Lam Psychiatric Center under the supervision of correctional officers commonly known as the "Mystery Group". He is currently being held in solitary confinement. People familiar with the matter said that the relevant arrangements can prevent him from revealing the process of interrogation and detention in the Mainland, and also prevent him from contacting other prisoners and staff. When Li's sister accepted media enquiries, she said that she had not received any news, but only learned of the incident from the newspaper. Correctional Services Department refused to respond to any details.

== 30 March ==
=== National People's Congress substantially reformed the composition of the Chief Executive Election Committee ===
On 30 March, local media cited National People’s Congress Standing Committee (NPCSC) Hong Kong delegate Tam Yiu-chung saying that all 167 members present had voted in favour of the amendments to Annex I and II of the Basic Law to revamp Hong Kong's electoral system. After the passage, President Xi Jinping signed President Orders No. 75 and 76 to amend the Annex I and II of the Hong Kong Basic Law respectively on the same day.

Under the new annexes, a Candidate Eligibility Review Committee would be set up to vet the qualifications of candidates, based on the approval of the Hong Kong Committee for Safeguarding National Security according to the review by the National Security Department of the Hong Kong Police Force (HKPF) of which its decision would be final and could not be appealed.

=== First trial under National Security Law begins, academic to explain protest slogan ===
The first trial under the national security law was originally scheduled to start on 23 June. The defense revealed that the defendant Tong Ying-kit was unable to cooperate with the original trial date due to the schedule, and it was difficult for the defense to find a senior who can handle the case in a bilingual manner. The defence counsel pointed to advice from the Legal Aid Department from one day earlier that the defendant would be granted legal aid, and said that he would file a judicial review of the absence of a jury – a provision under the national security law – and of the shortened trial period. Anthony Chau, a senior assistant criminal prosecutor (special duty) of the Department of Justice, quoted Article 42 of the law, stating that the court should handle the case in a timely manner and oppose the defense's application. Anthea Pang, a judge designated by the national security law, is worried that the review violates the requirements of the provisions. The defense also revealed that Lau Chi-pang, associate vice president (academic and external relations) of Lingnan University and professor of history, would serve as a witness for the prosecution to explain the meaning of the slogan Liberate Hong Kong, Revolution of Our Times. However, the defense stated that in the current political environment, it would be difficult to find suitable experts. It was anticipated that in his expert report, Lau, who is regarded as pro-government, would describe the slogan 'Liberate Hong Kong' as having the intention of splitting the country.

=== Court deletes multiple information on charges due to privacy concerns ===
Hong Kong Journalists Association stated that when court reporters from various media organizations went to the Magistrates' Court today to inspect the charges, they found that a number of information had been deleted, including the defendant's age, date of birth, ID number, occupation, and part of the residential address. The information of the police officer in charge in charge of the case, such as name, police district and rank, etc., cannot be accessed. The association is worried that the relevant policies will seriously affect the principle of judicial openness, and requested that the above-mentioned information be reopened for media access. The judiciary stated that the relevant personal information has a high degree of privacy, which may impair the proper execution of judicial work. Therefore, from 30 March, it will no longer provide the personal information of the defendant and the prosecution officer.

== 31 March ==
=== U.S. State Department releases annual Hong Kong policy report ===
U.S. State Department released the 2020 Hong Kong Policy Report. Secretary of State Antony Blinken accused the Chinese government of genocide against Uyghurs in Xinjiang. He also pointed out that after the implementation of the Hong Kong national security law, there have been many incidents that have seriously undermined the rights and freedoms of the people of Hong Kong. Such as the use of the national security law and other laws to treat opposition politicians, abuse of power and arbitrary arrests, postponement of Legislative Council elections, pressure on judicial independence, academic and press freedom, and de facto prohibition of public demonstrations. SAR government issued a statement strongly opposing the comments on the Hong Kong SAR in the Human Rights Report of the US State Department. It means that the government attaches great importance to and firmly safeguards human rights and freedoms in Hong Kong. It criticized the United States for slandering the national security law for political purposes is obviously a hypocritical act of double standards. At the same time, it does not respect the judicial system of the Hong Kong and undermines the spirit of the rule of law, reiterating that foreign governments should not interfere in the internal affairs of the Hong Kong in any form.

=== Liberal Studies to Citizenship and Social Development Division name change to be implemented in September ===
Curriculum Development Council and the Public Examination Committee of the HKEAA held a joint meeting in the afternoon to review and approve the optimization plan for the four core subjects of high school (namely Chinese, English, Mathematics and Liberal Studies). It is recommended that the Liberal Studies subject be renamed Citizenship and Society Development Section. The curriculum will focus on the three themes of Hong Kong, the country and the contemporary world. There will be no independent thematic inquiry (IES) and provide students with 'learning opportunities in the Mainland'. The Council hopes that the Education Bureau will accept the proposal as soon as possible, so that the scheme will be fully implemented in the S4 in the 2021/22 school year, that is, from September this year, so that students can "be benefited as soon as possible". The new name 'Citizenship and Social Development' also needs to be educated. The final decision will be made by the bureau. However, the press release did not mention the controversies and doubts caused by the changes to the four core sections, and only listed the key points of the changes in each section.
