= Timeline of reactions to the 2020 Hong Kong national security law (May 2021) =

Timeline of the 2019–2020 Hong Kong protests
2019			March–June				July	August	September	October	November	December
2020	January	February	March	April	May	June	July	August	September	October	November	December
2021	January	February	March	April	May	June	July	August	September–November			December

On 14 May, authorities froze the assets of pro-democracy media tycoon Jimmy Lai. This was the first time that the pertaining provision in Article 43 of the national security law was applied. While Chief Executive Carrie Lam said on 18 May that the move would serve to bolster the status of Hong Kong as an international financial hub, several senior bankers and corporate lawyers not associated with Lai's accounts opined that the action – which was followed at the end of the month by a warning from the Security Secretary to banks against dealing with the frozen assets – was exposing risks for clients and top financial managers in Hong Kong.

At the end of the month, authorities banned for the second time in a row the annual 4 June vigil in memory of the Tiananmen massacre, citing pandemic concerns.

== 3 May ==
=== 3 of the 12 Hong Kong activists involved in a new case brought to court ===
Among the 12 Hong Kong activists who returned to Hong Kong after serving their sentences in the Mainland in March, Cheung Chun-fu, Cheung Ming-yu and Yim Man-him, 3 were involved in a conspiracy to assault the police and appeared in the Eastern Magistrates' Court. The three accused were charged on December 8, 2019, and they conspired with others to illegally and maliciously harm a police officer with the intention of causing serious bodily harm to the Hong Kong police officer. And Cheung was also charged with possession of 2 boxes of fireworks in a unit of Glee Industrial Building in Chai Wan Kok, Tsuen Wan along with Wong Wai-yin from 3 to 8 December 2019; and of possession of 4 boxes of fireworks in the same unit on 8 December 2019. The can contains a pepper spray. Cheung was also charged with possession of offensive weapons and other tools suitable for illegal purposes, but was also charged with one count of possession of explosives and one count of possession of unlicensed firearms. The prosecution today applied to confiscate the bail of three people totaling HK$48,000, which was approved by the magistrate. The case was postponed to 7 June for delivery procedures, at which time the case will be referred to the High Court for trial. The three people did not apply for bailout and continue to be under the custody of the Correctional Services Department.

=== Student pleads guilty on 6 months after Prince Edward attack ===
A 19-year-old student who had participated in protests in Sai Yeung Choi Street South, Mong Kok, near Soy Street and Nelson Street on 22 February 2020 was charged with riot. The defendant originally had one crime of assaulting a policeman, but was allowed to put it on file in court and not to continue the prosecution. The defendant pleaded guilty in the District Court and was remanded until sentencing on 24 May, during which time his background report will be requested.

== 4 May ==
=== Three people imprisoned for illegally detaining woman during 2019 protests ===
Two men and one woman, including a female teacher and male social worker, were sentenced to prison terms between 10 and 15 months in the District Court in Wan Chai. In April, the three had been found guilty of false imprisonment of a woman on 7 July 2019 at the close of a protest in Mong Kok, with one of the defendants additionally found guilty of indecent assault. At the protest, the woman had been surrounded by a crowd who accused her of taking photos of protesters, with some suggesting that she was a plainclothes police officer. During the siege of 14 minutes, she was pushed to the ground and not allowed to leave when yelling for help; she eventually broke through the encirclement and fled. The female teacher expressed disappointment with the judgment, saying that she had only been there to mediate. The judge said that the defendants "had jointly spread hatred against police and bullied a lone woman with an aim to intimidate and silence people", and that a "punitive" sentence was called for.

== 5 May ==
=== Lam Cheuk-ting drop charges against Commissioner of Police ===
Democratic Party Central Committee member Winfield Chong held a press conference. He quoted Lam Cheuk-ting, who was still remanded after charged with national security law, after consulting the legal opinions and the wishes of the other 8 plaintiffs, and considering the recent political and legal environment in Hong Kong, he also hoped to provide 612 Humanitarian Fund. The Fund assisted more Hong Kong people in need and decided to terminate the Yuen Long attack lawsuit against Commissioner of Police Chris Tang. Former chairman of the Democratic Party, Albert Ho, pointed out that the case must be set aside for at least one year for processing, and that he must pay a large amount of legal costs if he loses the case. He also said that Lam is exhausted.

=== Tsuen Wan protesters sentenced for rioting on joint enterprise doctrine ===
On 15 April, three men and one woman were convicted in the District Court of riot and arson during protests that had occurred on 1 October 2019 in Tsuen Wan. After hearing the defense's plea, the judge Ernest Lin cited the 'joint enterprise' doctrine in the recent court of appeal case and pointed out that three of them were convicted of environmental evidence and there was no substantive evidence to prove that they were involved in the riot. The judge described the above situation as a "mini-war", saying that the actual "military power" of the police and the demonstrators was not proportional, and said that "if it is a real war, there is no suspense about who wins and who loses." It was even described that the police had "beared and restrained" when enforcing the law, and had not used all their weapons. In the end, the defendant was sentenced to 4 years and 3 months for the 21-year-old and 27-year-old defendant, and 4 years and 5 months for the 24-year-old social worker's assistant. The 40-year-old cleaner was sentenced to 4 years and 6 months in prison for arson, of which 2 months were divided into riot sentences, and the total sentence was 4 years and 8 months. The other defendant had been arrested and wanted by the court because he did not appear in court on time.

=== Wu Chi-wai's emergency bail rejected ===
The former chairman of the Democratic Party, Wu Chi-wai, who was remanded in custody from January 2021 until now, his 92-years-old father died earlier. When he applied to go out for funerals, the Correctional Services Department rejected the application on the grounds of safeguarding safety, and instead offered to use video for Wu to 'pay homage to his legacy.' His team members revealed that Wu and his family found the relevant practices unacceptable and disrespectful to his father, so they refused to arrange, saying that they were heartbroken not to see his father for the last time. Former chairman of the Democratic Party, Albert Ho, criticized the decision of the CSD as "inappropriate and inhumane".

=== Chef sentenced to prison ===
A 50-year-old chef displayed or left a roadblock outside No. 239 Sha Tsui Road, Tsuen Wan, on 12 November 2019, obstructing vehicles in public places; and in possession of 3 devices capable of emitting laser beams in the same place on the same day; He was charged with causing obstruction in public places and possessing offensive weapons. The defendant denied the charge and was found guilty after trial. He was sentenced in West Kowloon Magistrates' Court. Magistrate Colin Wong pointed out that the defendant clamored at the scene of the blockage, which affected the traffic, and that he possessed multiple laser pointers for himself and others to use, which made the case more serious, and finally sentenced the defendant to immediate imprisonment for 8 months.

== 6 May ==
=== Members of Returning Valiant were arrested for violating national security law ===
In the morning, Returning Valiant stated on its Facebook page that some members were arrested for violating the Hong Kong national security law. According to the news, at least 7 people were arrested. It was related to the burglary involving 4 members who infiltrated the Po Leung Kuk Laws Foundation College in Tseung Kwan O. The two were students of the school. During subsequent police investigations, it was discovered that some of the arrested persons were members of the Returning Valiant, and slogans involving Hong Kong independence were found in the apartment. The case was handed over to the National Security Department for follow-up, after which three people were arrested. The seven arrested persons were suspected of burglary and inciting secession in violation of the national security law.

=== Chickeeduck store raided for national security law allegations ===
At 5 pm, about 40 to 50 police officers pulled up an orange tape cordon outside the newly opened Chickeeduck store on Heung Shing Street in Tsuen Wan, enclosed the store, searched for 1 hour and left. The owner, Herbert Chow, said that the National Security Department of the police conducted a search for up to one hour, but did not explain the reason. He only said that if a product that violates the national security law is found, it will reserve the right to prosecute. He denounced it as white terror, the rule of law is dead, and he clearly stated that he would continue to operate. The source said that someone complained to the police that the store was suspected of violating the law.

=== Activists sentenced for last year unauthorized Tiananmen vigil anniversary ===
The activists participating in last year Tiananmen vigil anniversary was charged with unlawful assembly. In the case, four defendants Joshua Wong, Lester Shum, Tiffany Yuen and Jannelle Leung all pleaded guilty to one crime of knowingly taking part in an unlawful assembly. The case was sentenced in the District Court in the morning. Judge Stanley Chan sentenced Wong to 10 months, Shum sentenced to 6 months, Yuen and Leung sentenced to 4 months in prison each.

== 7 May ==
=== PolyU student union members to undergo a disciplinary hearing over commemorative siege postcards ===
The Facebook page of the Hong Kong Polytechnic University Student Union revealed that the vice-president and the two secretaries of the student union were suspected of having issued a postcard to commemorate the Siege of the Hong Kong Polytechnic University. The believed that it would affect the reputation of the university. The three of them will have to undergo a disciplinary hearing next month.

=== Leisure and Cultural Services Department reviews 9 books for violation of national security laws ===
After the Leisure and Cultural Services Department requested public libraries to remove nine political books for 'review' in July last year, the department once again suspended relevant book services on the grounds of the national security law legislation. A search for the books on the webpages of public libraries showed "no matching search results".

=== Professor who used the 'Five Demands' hand gesture while chanting slogan sentenced to 3 months in prison ===
A 50-year-old man with a Ph.D. and a former university professor was charged with chanting slogans during a protest against the National Anthem Ordinance on Hennessy Road in Causeway Bay on 24 May 2020. He admitted that without hiring a lawyer, he admitted that he committing an act that disturbs public order. Principal Magistrate Peter Law of the Eastern Magistrates' Court believed that the defendant's chanting of political slogans at the scene had serious and dangerous consequences, and he reprimanded the defendant for "not sitting in jail until there is a reason for bleating." He was sentenced to immediate imprisonment for 3 months.

=== U.S. urges the Hong Kong government to immediately release participants in the Tiananmen vigil anniversary ===
U.S. Secretary of State Antony Blinken said in a statement that the Hong Kong government should immediately release the prisoners Joshua Wong, Lester Shum, Tiffany Yuen and Jannelle Leung of the unauthorized Tiananmen vigil anniversary. He said that all persons who peacefully exercise their right to freedom should be released. Later, Hong Kong Public Prosecutors issued a statement to refute it, saying that it would never agree with the absurd remarks made by some individuals. The statement stated that the laws of Hong Kong have always respected and protected the rights and freedoms under the Basic Law, but these rights and freedoms are not absolute and can be restricted, including those based on public order and the protection of the rights and freedoms of others.

== 8 May ==
=== Wu Chi-wai granted emergency bail to attend his father's funeral ===
Former chairman of the Democratic Party, Wu Chi-wai, who was on remand, applied to go out for his father's funeral and was rejected by the Correctional Services Department. He was temporarily released on bail from the High Court. The day before, judge Esther Toh granted an emergency bail application for Wu to attend his 92-year-old's father funeral after the correctional department's denial of his initial request sparked wide criticism. After staying for 40 minutes, he was escorted by the police and left. Nearly a hundred police officers are on guard outside the funeral home.

== 10 May ==
=== 22-year-old male student sentenced to 3 years and 2 months in jail for possession of petrol bomb in Wan Chai ===
In November 2019, 5 men and 1 woman were charged with one count of conspiracy to arson, and one count of conspiracy to arson, and one count of conspiracy to arson, and one count of intent to possess goods as alternate charges crime of damaging the property of others. Among them, the 22-year-old male student, Jawin Mok, was pleaded guilty. District Court judge Eddie Yip sentenced him to a heavy sentence involving petrol bombs and that he would have to pay a great price to try the law. Mok was sentenced to 38 months in prison.

=== Arson in Mong Kok Police Station conviction ===
A 21-year-old construction worker was allegedly arrested on the spot after throwing a petrol bomb at the side entrance of the Mong Kok Police Station on 14 October 2019, and was charged with one count of intentional and attempted arson. The defendant pleaded guilty; District Court judge Anthony Kwok stated in his sentence that the Hong Kong police is an important rule of law institution, and that the defendant's actions challenge the rule of law. The defendant was sentenced to 40 months in prison.

=== Taxi driver convicted for carrying petrol bomb ===
A 32-year-old taxi driver was seized by the police in Tai Po in October 2019 in possession of 40 petrol bombs and igniters. He was charged with one count of conspiracy to set fire and one count of alternate possession with intent to damage property. The defendant denied the charge. After the case was tried in the District Court, the judge found him guilty and ordered him to be remanded until next week.

=== National Security Department's reporting hotline has received more than 100,000 messages in half a year ===
Hong Kong police said that the National Security Department of the Police Force launched the National Security Department Reporting Hotline in November 2020, and has received more than 100,000 reports in the past six months, and thanks the citizens who have provided information through the hotline. However, Civil Rights Observer, a NGO that monitors police power, is concerned that the mechanism allows anonymous reporting. The threshold is very low. The police releases figures as a means of propaganda.

=== 2 people sentenced to 9 months imprisonment for possession of screwdrivers in the rally ===
A 24-year-old part-time tutor and a 24-year-old former mechanic of the Electrical and Mechanical Services Department took possession of screwdrivers, spanner, hammer, pliers, torch and other tools. The two persons were each charged with the crime of 'possesses a tool suitable for illegal use and intends to use it for an illegal purpose'. They both denied the charges and were convicted at the end of last month after being tried in the Eastern Magistrates' Court. On the 10 May, Magistrate Winnie Lau stated that in order to protect public safety and order, the court must impose a deterrent penalty. Since the tools possessed by the two persons have similar destructive powers, 10 months were used as the starting point for the sentencing. Taking into account the late remorse of the two persons, one month was deducted as appropriate, and the two persons were sentenced to 9 months imprisonment immediately.

=== Female student sentenced for protest against the anti-mask law outside Ngau Tau Kok station ===
An 18-year-old female student of the Vocational Training Council participated in a demonstration against the Prohibition on Face Covering Regulation outside the Ngau Tau Kok station on 13 October 2019. The case she admitted was that about 200 demonstrators set up roadblocks on Ngau Tau Kok Road outside the Ngau Tau Kok station that afternoon. When the police arrived to deal with the situation, the demonstrators fled in the direction of Kowloon Bay. The defendant was subsequently stopped by police in Lotus Towers 1-storey car park, she was dressed in black and with muffled face, and police seized a batch of bond wire, gas mask and helmet and other items on her. She was charged with the crime of unlawful assembly. The defendant pleaded guilty at the end of last month and was sentenced at the Kwun Tong Magistrates' Court. Magistrate May Chung pointed out that the demonstrations in this case were on a large scale, with people clamoring and brandishing iron rods, and the defendant had prepared gloves and face masks to hide his identity after committing the crime. Even after considering that the defendant was a first-time offender and voluntarily confessed, he still believed that the penalty must be deterred and punished, and the defendant was eventually sentenced to a rehabilitation center.

== 11 May ==
=== Death of Marco Leung inquiry begins ===
Coroner's Court opened an inquest on the cause of death of an anti-extradition bill protester, Marco Leung, who fell to death in Pacific Place in Admiralty on 15 June 2019. The court revealed that Leung's parents and sisters had recorded statements at the police station two days later at the end of August 2019 before they left Hong Kong, for unknown destination. The family of the deceased did not appear in court. And Leung's notebook reads "I felt dejected about this Hong Kong. I pondered these past few months but could not find an answer to the future. [The decision] today is my wish. The government is the cause of it all." Another page reads "Comprehensive Evacuation and Sending", "Release of Student Wounded", "We are not a rioters" and "Carrie Lam step down down."

=== Pakistani youth sentenced to rehabilitation center for breaking traffic light ===
A 19-year-old Pakistani youth named Mahmood Hamaad attempted to damage a government iron gate with fire outside the main entrance of Mong Kok Police Station on 5 September 2019, and attempted to damage a set of traffic lights at the junction of Prince Edward Road West and Nathan Road. He was charged with two counts of attempted arson and attempted criminal damage. Last month, he pleaded guilty at the District Court. Judge Edmond Lee stated that the crime of attempted arson was serious when sentencing. However, considering the special circumstances of the case and the defendant's circumstances, he pleaded guilty and considered it appropriate to sentence him to a rehabilitation center. The judge even urged the defendant to cherish this opportunity and live a life in accordance with the rules in the future. Hamaad was eventually sentenced to a rehabilitation center.

=== Government submits a bill to combat doxxing behavior ===
Constitutional and Mainland Affairs Bureau submitted a file to the Hong Kong Legislative Council. It plans to submit an amendment bill to combat 'doxxing' behavior. It also proposes to introduce crimes against 'doxxing' behavior under the current Privacy Ordinance. Once convicted, the maximum fine is HK$1 million and imprisonment for 5 years. The ordinance also states that "the family member suffered psychological harm" is also an offence.

== 12 May ==
=== American Chamber of Commerce in Hong Kong survey 42% of members planning to leave Hong Kong ===
American Chamber of Commerce in Hong Kong conducted a survey from May 5 to 9 this year and interviewed 325 members. It shows that 42% of the members surveyed are considering or planning to leave Hong Kong. Among them, 62% said that the Hong Kong national security law is disturbing. They believe that the 'red line' under the law is vague and repetitive, and they worry that they will unknowingly say or write and would arrested by the police. Among the members interviewed who indicated that they would leave Hong Kong, nearly 4 adults indicated that they would leave within 3 to 5 years. The survey also shows that more than 40% of people are pessimistic about Hong Kong's future competitiveness. 58% of the respondents did not intend to leave Hong Kong, 77% of the interviewed members believed that the quality of life in Hong Kong was good, and 48% of the respondents believed that Hong Kong was close to the mainland market.

=== Cary Lo charged with wasting police time to appear in Tuen Mun Magistrates' Courts ===
In a Facebook post on 21 November 2020, Tuen Mun District Councillor Cary Lo Chun-yu alleged that during police operations in Fung Yau Street Park, Yuen Long, earlier the same day, he had been detained by police and denied access to a lawyer. After investigation, the police accused Lo of making false statements, falsely claiming that he was arrested by the police and taken back to the police station. Lo had later withdrawn the post and apologized, ascribing it to a "serious discrepancy" arising during a telephone conversation with his assistant. On 25 November last year, Lo was arrested on suspicion of "wasting police time". After seeking legal advice, the police formally charged Lo with one count of 'intentionally providing false information and attempting to mislead police officers.' The case will appear in Tuen Mun Magistrates' Courts on 20 May.

=== Wan Chai MTR station case ===
On 15 September 2019, a 20-year-old male student was sprayed with expansion agent at the exit A1 of the MTR Wan Chai station on Lockhart Road and damaged the gate belonging to the MTR Corporation without legal excuse. He was charged with criminal damage. The defendant denied the charge and was convicted in the Eastern Magistrates' Court after trial. Magistrate Winnie Lau ordered him to be remanded until his sentence on 28 May, during which time she obtained reports from the detention center, rehabilitation center, and training center.

== 13 May ==
=== Carrie Lam, John Lee and Chris Tang received powder letters ===
Chief Executive Carrie Lam, Secretary for Security John Lee, and Commissioner of Police Chris Tang received white powder letters each. After the Explosive Ordnance Disposal Division staff arrived at the scene to investigate, they initially believed that the powder was not dangerous, and there was a piece of letter paper with Chinese characters in the letter, but the meaning was unclear, and there was no appeal or threat. The police are investigating the incident. The next day, Tang accepted an interview with a reporter from Shenzhen Satellite TV. He believed that the incident was a challenge to Hong Kong's law and order, and the incident proved that an effective mechanism was in place to prevent dangerous goods and other situations.

== 14 May ==
=== Chinese chef sentenced for stabbing a student ===
A 19-year-old male student was stabbed in the neck and stomach during the distribution of political event flyers at the Lennon Wall tunnel in Tai Po on 18 October 2019, by a chef of a Chinese roast meat shop named Liu Guosheng, who had come to Hong Kong on a two-way permit. Judge Andrew Chan of the High Court described the case as “one of the many meaningless violence incidents in Hong Kong” in 2019. He alleged that Liu had committed a premeditated crime and his actions destroyed the lives of young people, and that the victim not only suffered serious physical injuries, but also suffered psychologically. The judge took into account the defendant's plea and surrender and sentenced Liu to 6 years and 4 months in prison.

=== Security Bureau freezes Jimmy Lai's properties ===
Security Bureau issued a press release at 7 pm announcing that the Commissioner, in accordance with the implementation rules of Article 43 of the Hong Kong national security law, would freeze 70% of Jimmy Lai's shares and the properties of three companies in local bank accounts, involving capital estimates which is more than HK$500 million.

== 15 May ==
=== RTHK documentary episode won the Human Rights Press Awards ===
RTHK's Hong Kong Connection episode '7.21: Who Owns the Truth' won the Grand Prize in the "Radio and Television Category" of the 12th Human Rights Press Awards. The award ceremony was held on the same day. Although RTHK stated that it would not accept the award, Choy Yuk-ling and Cheng Sze-Sze, members of the Hong Kong Connection team, showed up to accept the award on the same day. They said that because they were not formal employees of Hong Kong and Taiwan, they were able to come and receive the award. Choy's reports of journalists cannot be publicly affirmed, which is "the sorrow of the times." Cheng stated that if he did not come to accept the award, he would be sorry for the person interviewed in the past two years, who provided CCTV footage, Choy Yuk-ling, and the production team. She also said that the freedom of the press in Hong Kong is currently in a "dark tunnel."

== 17 May ==
=== 10 activists pleads guilty for unauthorized 1 October rally ===
Ten pro-democracy activists, including the founder of Next Digital, Jimmy Lai, chairman of Hong Kong Alliance Lee Cheuk-yan, and his secretary Richard Tsoi, and the convener of the Civil Human Rights Front, Figo Chan, were charged with taking part in the unauthorized 1 October rally on Hong Kong Island on 1 October 2019. The case was in the District Court. The court opened the trial, and 10 people respectively admitted to organizing, participating in and inciting others to participate in the unapproved assembly before the trial. The court will sentence them on 28 May.

=== John Lee refuses to answer regarding freezing of Jimmy Lai's property ===
When the Secretary for Security John Lee met with reporters, he was asked whether the authorities would ban Apple Daily and Jimmy Lai's shares in Next Digital and other assets. He pointed out that the action has a legal basis, and the crackdown on crimes endangering national security in accordance with the law has nothing to do with journalism. At the same time, he stated that it would severely crack down on any illegal activities, especially those that endanger national security.

== 18 May ==
=== Pan-democrats remanded for unauthorized 1 October rally ===
The trial of 10 pan-democrats who participated in the unauthorized 1 October rally on Hong Kong Island opened on the second day. The prosecution requested that the bail of the six defendants be revoked and the video of the crime was played. After considering the statements made by the prosecution and defense in the afternoon, Judge Amanda Woodcock considered that it was a suitable time to remand all the defendants and sentenced them to 28 May. When Lee Cheuk-yan, Leung Kwok-hung, Albert Ho, and Jimmy Lai were standing in the prison bar while serving their sentences, many observers stood up and waved, chanting "Take it to the end!" and "A good man will live well!" Among them, Lai made a heart-shaped gesture and put his hands together in greeting.

=== Sha Tin District Councillor's office was searched by the National Security Department ===
Shatin District Councillor Chan Wan-tung revealed that four national security officers came to his office to take photos and make enquiries in the morning with a search warrant. They stayed for more than 10 minutes and left. He arrived at Tian Xin Police Station before 2 pm. According to the data, the local organization Returning Valiant borrowed the Chan's office to hold a press conference in February 2021, and was later reported by the Wen Wei Po.

=== Jobless man sentenced in prison ===
During the Rally for Uyghur Human Rights held in Edinburgh Place on 22 December 2019, after someone tore off the national flag from the flagpole, a large number of riot police dispersed and clashes broke out. Three men were later charged with rioting and other crimes. Among them, a 22-year-old jobless man named Leung Ka-wai, was charged with besieging and assaulting a police officer. He pleaded guilty to rioting and assaulting a police officer in the District Court. Judge Edmond Lee believed that the scale and violence of the riot was low at that time, and the defendant also did not use weapons, but committed the crime on impulse, and Leung eventually sentenced to 28 months in prison.

=== Double decker bus driver found guilty ===
On 6 September 2020, netizens launched a demonstration in Kowloon. A NWFB line 970 driver, Cheung Ho-yin, was accused of sounding the horn and driving fast while driving through Nathan Road. He was later charged with dangerous driving. Later, the prosecution charged him with accidentally driving a double-decker bus on Pokfulam Road near the Lady Ho Tung Hall on the same day. Cheung denied the charge. Today, the magistrate of the Kowloon City Magistrates' Court, Ada Yim, ruled that he was not guilty of dangerous driving and Pokfulam was guilty of careless driving. The magistrate believed that Cheung had committed two faults on the same day, and directly reprimanded the defendant, "Is his passengers safely tied to other road users?". She said that she would consider lose of driving licence, and the case was postponed to 8 June for sentencing.

=== Carrie Lam: Freezing property to strengthen Hong Kong's status as an international financial center ===
Chief Executive Carrie Lam met with the media before attending the executive meeting. She was asked about the freezing of Jimmy Lai's property by the Security Bureau. Lam Cheng pointed out that the relevant actions show that the SAR government is "very serious and rigorous" in performing its duty of safeguarding national security. She pointed out that it is not only the safety of Hong Kong society, but also the safety of 1.4 billion people. Therefore, law enforcement agencies will definitely act in accordance with the law. In contrast, Western media used this to attack Hong Kong's status as an international financial center. She described Hong Kong's status as an international financial center not only will not be affected, but it will be strengthened because no one can use Hong Kong's financial system to conduct acts that endanger national security.

== 20 May ==
=== Tong Ying-kit is involved in violation of the National Security Law and does not set up a jury review to lose the lawsuit ===
High Court judge Alex Lee dismissed Tong Ying-kit's review of not having a jury, and pointed out that the national security law created a 'new criminal trial model', and the Secretary for Justice became the sole decision maker to decide whether to adopt a jury in a national security law case. He believed that the application did not reasonable and arguable. It is understood that Tong will appeal.

== 22 May ==
=== Street singer arrested for singing Glory to Hong Kong ===
Filipino-Hong Kong street singer Oliver Ma was warned by three uniformed police officers while singing the English version of Glory to Hong Kong on the streets of Central in the evening. The police later turned off his microphone box and arrested him for 'public nuisance'. He stated that his performance tools were confiscated, and he was later released on bail of HK$500 and went to court in mid-June.

== 24 May ==
=== Singing with You ===
Civic Party's "dominant brother" Chang Kin-fung was charged with "Singing with You" in Shatin New Town Plaza on 1 May 2020. Magistrate Pang Leung-ting ruled that the crime was not guilty. Pang pointed out the 599G Prohibition on Group Gathering' Regulation. It did not explain or define what is meant by 'gathering', criticizing the prosecution for misunderstanding the legal provisions. Ask the people who plan to shop in the mall have violated the "restricted gathering order." However, Pang described the defendant as a "technical exoneration" and was not approved to apply for costs.

=== A student pleads guilty for rioting on 6 months anniversary of Prince Edward attack ===
A 21-year-old man took part in the riot in Sai Yeung Choi Street, Mong Kok, near Soy Street and Nelson Street on 29 February 2020. He was charged with riots, pleaded guilty earlier, and was sentenced to 2 years and 10 months in prison in the District Court. The judge sentenced the riot as a serious crime. The seriousness of this case is that the police officer was surrounded by many people. The defendant was in it. He threw objects at him three times and picked up bamboo sticks. He followed the police even more closely. Running away, the consequences will be disastrous. The judge considered that the defendant was the first offender, was not the leading role, and was affected by the condition of his judgment, so he sentenced him to prison.

== 25 May ==
=== The jury ruled that Marco Leung died of misadventure ===
On 15 June 2019, the anti-extradition bill protester Marco Leung fell to his death outside Pacific Place in Admiralty. The coroner guided the jury to consider 3 verdict options in the morning, including 'suicide', 'died by misadventure' or 'died by accident'. The jury retired from the court for more than 5 hours after deliberating and unanimously ruled that Leung died of misadventure.

=== Media claims about female protester shot in eye reignite fake news allegations ===
A comment piece by Sing Tao Daily alleged on 25 May that the eye injury of a woman during a protest on 11 August 2019, for which she has become an iconic symbol of the protests at that time, were not as serious as said at the time by the Hospital Authority. This was in response to an Oriental Daily News report from 24 May which claimed, based on exclusive sources, that the woman had left Hong Kong for Taiwan on 30 September 2020, with both of her eyes appearing to be in good condition, according to photographs purportedly of her. The Hospital Authority repudiated claims that it had been lying about the injury as "unfounded". Pro-establishment lawmaker Elizabeth Quat said that the case had caused far-reaching harm in Hong Kong, and called for legislation against fake news to be enacted.

In April 2021, the woman had lost an appeal which had aimed at obtaining police warrants to seize medical documentations about the case. Police did not disclose the results of their investigation.

== 26 May ==
=== Department of Justice appeal the sentence against a boy of probation ===
An 18-year-old boy damaged and possessed a special-purpose crowd management vehicle belonging to the Hong Kong government without legal excuses outside the Wan Chai Golden Union Commercial Center on 1 January 2020, during the 2020 New Year's Day protest. A plastic bottle containing 210ml of cyclohexane, methylcyclohexane and 19g of sucrose organic mixture, a utility knife, a lighter and a hammer. Charged with criminal damage and possession of objects with intent to damage property. He pleaded guilty earlier and was sentenced to 18 months' probation order by Principal Magistrate Bina Chainrai in Eastern Magistrates' Court in August 2020. Department of Justice later considered that the sentence was too light and applied for a review of the sentence and suggested that the defendant be sentenced to the custodial sentence, but the application was rejected by the original trial principal magistrate Chainrai. Department of Justice filed a review with the Court of Appeal of the High Court, and finally won the case. The three judges of the Court of Appeal pointed out that the trial magistrate Chainrai made a mistake in her sentence. The sentence was too focused on the respondent's personal background, but the sentence failed to reflect the seriousness of his crime and other factors. Therefore, the Department of Justice ruled that the review was straightforward. The respondent should be sentenced to custodial punishment, so he decided to obtain reports from the rehabilitation center, reeducation center, and training center for the respondent, and remanded him to 10 June for a new sentence.

== 27 May ==
=== John Lee warns banks that dealing with Jimmy Lai's assets is liable to criminal persecution ===
Reuters reported that security chief John Lee had sent letters to imprisoned founder of Next Digital Jimmy Lai, as well as branches of HSBC and Citibank, threatening that any dealing with the bank account of Lai would be punishable by up to seven years in prison. The letter referred to the freezing of assets from earlier that month. The Reuters report cited financial advisers of Lai, as well as statements by Lai dating back to May 2020, as saying that his assets were spread across Asia, Canada and the United States; one advisor gave as reason that they were certain that the Hong Kong government wanted to "choke" the Apple Daily. One adviser said that, while the off-shore assets would fall under jurisdictions in their respective countries and thus be secure notwithstanding the fact that the accounts were set up in Hong Kong, the action against Lai's assets could hurt the financial industry in the city and lead other investors to channel their investments elsewhere, with Singapore being a favourite destination. Lee had said a week earlier that the move was not taking aim at media work but related to national security. Chief Executive Carrie Lam said the action would hopefully strengthen the status of the city as a financial hub, through ensuring that "no-one can use our financial system to carry out acts endangering national security". HSBC declined to comment on the incident, and Citibank stated that it must abide by all local laws.

=== HKUST girl convicted for unlawful assembly and sentenced to 10 weeks in prison ===
On Halloween on 31 October 2019, some citizens launched the 'Hello, Nine Officials Mask Night'. A 19-year-old HKUST girl wearing a mask marched to Lan Kwai Fong, Central. She was charged with participating in an illegal assembly and violating the Prohibition on Face Covering Regulation. She was convicted of taking part in an unlawful assembly. Magistrate of the Eastern Magistrates' Court, Edward Wong, claimed that the 13 plea letters submitted by the defendant, including the defendant's relatives and friends, the principal of the secondary school, and teachers, were considered very rare. The defendant also helped a friend suffering from severe depression and was thanked by his family. The defense counsel pointed out that although the report recommended that the defendant should be admitted to a rehabilitation center, the period of detention was 6 to 8 months. In addition, the defendant was excellent in character and learning, and no character training was required. He believed that the court would impose an immediate short-term imprisonment that would allow her to stay on schedule. Proceed to the third year of university. In the end, the judge considered that the rehabilitation center was not very helpful to the defendant. Considering the defendant's age and academic background, he sentenced her to 10 weeks of immediate imprisonment.

=== District Councillor Ben Lam said that he would no longer receive flowers for 8.31 attack ===
In the past 8.31 Prince Edward Station attack, the Yau Tsim Mong District Councillor was responsible for collecting flowers and offering flowers for the public. However, Ben Lam said in an interview with Apple Daily that under the constant changes in the political situation, especially the bill sworn by district councillors, and every flower offering activity has the National Security Department staff to monitor the Prince Edward station. They decided to stop accepting flowers from this month, but promised to continue to provide support services for arrests that night. He described the regime that offering flowers and reaping flowers also means spreading hatred.

== 28 May ==
=== Sentencing of pan-democrats who convicted for illegal protest on National Day ===
District Court judge Amanda Woodcock pronounced the verdict at 11 am. She pointed out that although the defendants advocated a 'peaceful' demonstration, they believed that it was a period of violence and described them. It is "naive and unrealistic", which means that imprisonment is the only suitable sentence option. This case cannot be compared with the 8.18 and 8.31 assembly cases sentenced earlier, because the Hong Kong environment on 1 October was more violent. Considering that Figo Chan, Lee Cheuk-yan, Leung Kwok-hung, and Albert Ho were involved in inciting others to participate in the demonstration, and the guilt was heavier than the other defendants, so a higher starting point of sentencing was adopted. The following activists were sentenced are:

- Jimmy Lai, Yeung Sum, Cyd Ho, and Sin Chung-kai pleaded guilty to 1 count of organizing unlawful assembly; Lai was sentenced to 14 months in prison, and together with his other two illegal demonstrations, a total of 20 months in prison; Yeung was sentenced to 14 months in prison; Ho was sentenced to 14 months in prison. Among them, Ho was sentenced to 8 months in prison for another illegal demonstration case, which was executed at the same time, that is, 2 cases were sentenced to 14 months in prison; Sin was sentenced to 14 months in prison, with a suspended sentence of 24 months;
- Lee Cheuk-yan pleaded guilty to 1 crime of organizing unlawful assembly and 1 crime of inciting others to taking part in unlawful assembly and sentenced to 18 months of imprisonment, which was executed at the same time as other illegal protests, totaling 20 months;
- Albert Ho pleaded guilty to 1 count of organizing unlawful assembly and 1 count of inciting others to participate in unlawful assembly and sentenced to 18 months in prison;
- Leung Kwok-hung pleaded guilty to 1 count of organizing an unlawful assembly and 1 crime of inciting others to participate in an unlawful assembly. He was sentenced to 18 months in prison. The sentence was executed concurrently with other illegal demonstrations, totaling 22 months in prison;
- Figo Chan pleaded guilty to 1 count of organizing unlawful assembly and 1 count of inciting others to participate in unlawful assembly and sentenced to 18 months in prison;
- Avery Ng pleaded guilty to 1 count of organizing an unlawful assembly and 1 crime of participating in an unlawful assembly, and was sentenced to 14 months in prison and a 14-day probation order was executed. A total of 14 months and 14 days were imprisoned.
- Richard Tsoi pleaded guilty to 1 crime of organizing an unlawful assembly and 1 crime of participating in an unlawful assembly, and was sentenced to 14 months in prison and 24 months of probation.

Sin Chung-kai, who was granted a suspended sentence, said outside the court that the sentence was "unprecedented in the history of Hong Kong," and described his feelings as -heavy. Their legal team is actively considering appeals against the commutation. Leung Kwok-hung's wife, Chan Po-ying, also believes that the sentence is very heavy. She pointed out that in the past, most of them were only fined, but now participating in demonstrations and assemblies not approved by the police will face years of imprisonment, worrying about the 'chilling effect' of future assemblies. In addition, Figo Chan said through social media that the Civil Human Rights Front would not be dissolved. Johannes Chan, professor of public law at the Faculty of Law of the University of Hong Kong, believes that participants have no way to control the behavior of others in the assembly, and they are worried about stifling the right to peaceful assembly. In the future, there will be heavy sentences for peaceful assemblies.

=== 14-year-old girl sentenced for unlawful assembly ===
A 14-year-old girl participated in an unlawful assembly with other unknown persons in the public area of Prince Edward Road West and Water Canal, Nathan Road, Mong Kok from 24 to 25 September 2019. She was charged with the crime of unlawful assembly. After trial, he was found guilty and sentenced by Magistrate Creamy Chan to probation for 24 months in the West Kowloon Magistrates' Court. Chan emphasized that the defendant's situation in this case was special. The probation was not because the defendant was young, but because the defendant's father died 2 months before the incident, and the defendant suffered from depression. The magistrate understands that young people with mental problems may aggravate their condition if they are sentenced to detention, and therefore follow the recommendations to impose a probation order.

=== 21-year-old student sentenced to 4 years and 3 months in prison for rioting at Reclaim Tuen Mun Park rally ===
A 21-year-old male student named Lee Ho-ming, participated in the riot outside Tuen Mun Times Square during the Reclaim Tuen Mun Park rally on 21 September 2019, along with other unidentified persons, and possessed a trekking pole in the same place on the same day. He was charged with rioting and possession of offensive weapons in public places. Lee denied the charge and was convicted after trial. In the West Kowloon Magistrates' Court, he was sentenced to 4 years and 3 months imprisonment by the Deputy District judge Wong Sze-lai. Wong once again emphasized that there were more than 200 demonstrators at the scene of the incident. The traffic was paralyzed, and some people threw bricks and petrol bombs at the police. This shows that the scale of the demonstrations was huge. The defendant stood at the forefront of the demonstrators, holding a shield and a trekking pole in front of the police. The end of the trekking pole was a metal pointed tip without a rubber plug, which was lethal. The judge believed that Lee "has a shield in one hand and a staff in the other, as if he is on guard and fighting at any time." Lee stands on the front line, plays an active role, undermines social peace, and ignores laws and regulations. He must be sentenced to deterrent punishment, and immediate imprisonment is the only option.

=== 20-year-old boy convicted of damaging the gate of Wan Chai MTR station with swelling glue ===
On 15 September 2019, a 20-year-old man sprayed an expanding agent on the iron gate at Lockhart Road MTR Wan Chai station Exit A1. He was charged with criminal damage and was convicted after trial. Eastern Magistrates’ Court Magistrate Winnie Lau believes the entrance and exit had been closed at the time of the incident, but there were still staff and citizens in the station. The iron gates involved were sprayed with expansion agent, making it difficult for the staff to open the gates and affecting citizens' access. The defendant and another person had a plan to ignite the fire. If the place really caught fire, it would hinder the escape of citizens and MTR staff, and even affect the property and personal safety of nearby people. Considering that it did not cause a major impact, it was deemed that short-term imprisonment was not applicable to this case, and the defendant was finally sentenced to a rehabilitation center in accordance with the report's recommendations.

== 29 May ==
=== Security Bureau warns against participation in Tiananmen vigil ===
The Security Bureau warned Hongkongers that participation in either the vigil in memory of Tiananmen massacre on 4 June, which had been banned ostensively due to the COVID-19 pandemic in Hong Kong, or in a commemorative long-distance run on 30 May, would be liable to up to five years in prison. The penalty for publicizing it would be up to one year. Earlier that day, the Hong Kong Alliance in Support of Patriotic Democratic Movements of China, who had been organizing the annual vigils, had their appeal against the ban rejected.

== 31 May ==
=== Fifth day of 47 pro-democracy activists trial ===
The hearings on the case resumed on 31 May 2021. The court postponed further proceedings until 8 July. Until 28 June, defendants in the case will be presented with evidence and allowed to enter a plea, otherwise, their case will be moved to the High Court, where some analysts say, could consider harsher sentences than lower courts.

=== Activists publish songs for charged pro-democracy primaries participants ===
Former Kwun Tong District Councillor Li Ka-tat was charged with 'conspiracy to subvert state power' for participating in the democratic primary election. The band, Forward, in which he is the lead vocalist released the song Leaving Half a Life on YouTube, hoping to encourage Hong Kong people, Li, and other people imprisoned for freedom. The band members filmed on the hillside beside Kwun Tong, Admiralty and Stanley Prison. And Ventus Lau's girlfriend, Emilia Wong, released the work Starting from Zero adapted in the Lai Chi Kok Reception Center, which was changed from Next Year Today. In the music video, Tommy Yuen, Joe Tay, Albert Lui, Andy Lao, Chan Wan-tung, William Shek and Xiong Zibing, etc. all have a chorus.
