= Timeline of the 2019–2020 Hong Kong protests (September 2020) =

September events of the 2019–2020 pro-democracy demonstrations in Hong Kong

Timeline of the 2019–2020 Hong Kong protests
| 2019 | | | March–June | | | | July | August | September | October | November | December |
| 2020 | January | February | March | April | May | June | July | August | September | October | November | December |
| 2021 | January | February | March | April | May | June | July | August | September–November | | | December |

On 6 September, the biggest protests in the course of the 2019-20 Hong Kong protests since 1 July occurred in the city. The fresh protests were in a large part due to the day having been the scheduled election day for the Legislative Council; on 31 July, the Hong Kong government had the elections postponed by a year, citing the COVID-19 pandemic, a justification that was widely doubted. The unauthorized protests resulted in nearly 300 arrests, one of them on suspected violation of the national security law, and brought the total number of arrests during the entire protests since June 2019 to above 10,000.

The national security law continued to exert a major influence both within Hong Kong and internationally, for its perceived devastating effect on the "One country, two systems" principle forming the foundation of governance in the city, even though Hong Kong and mainland government officials had asserted that it had rather acted as a stabilizer. The state visit of Chinese Foreign Minister Wang Yi to five European countries, which concluded on 1 September, was accompanied by protests at each stop, and the topic of Hong Kong was brought up by several of his hosts. The lack of substantial news of twelve detainees who had been caught by Chinese authorities on 23 August in a botched attempt to flee from Hong Kong to Taiwan met with broad condemnation, despite assurances by China that the detained did have legal support. Other news from throughout the month, from disparate areas, suggested that large parts of the population of the city had either rejected the local government's assurances that the national security law would only affect a small minority of the population, or saw the international negative responses and sanctions which were triggered by the law as exacting a heavy and lasting toll on the economy of the city, on top of the just recently calmed third wave of the COVID-19 pandemic.

== Events ==
=== 1 September ===
==== International response: Germany ====
German Foreign Minister Heiko Maas met with China's Foreign Minister Wang Yi as the final stop of Wang's European tour on bilateral talks. Before the meeting, Hong Kong activist Nathan Law along with tens of protesters waving Uighurs' flags and "Stand with Hong Kong" signs, staged a protest against China's visit. Law also presented a letter to German officials on August 30, imploring Germany and other European countries to "go further" in their "reassessment of policy towards China". In the meeting with Wang, Maas called for the withdrawal of China's national security law in Hong Kong, claiming that Germany wished to see "the principle of 'one country, two systems' to be fully applied". Maas also brought up the now delayed Hong Kong legislative election, calling for the election to take place "quickly and unhindered".

=== 2 September ===
==== Nathan Law urges the West to take action ====
The day after protesting Wang Yi's presence in Germany, Nathan Law held a 10-minute interview with German news agency Deutsche Welle. In the interview Nathan Law called on Germany and all democratic countries to form a united front of democracy to defend against Communist China's "infiltration". Law urged every country to interact with China with dignity, and not to shy away from bringing up human rights issues.

==== National security law effect: British expat teachers in Hong Kong consider resigning ====
In interviews with British newspaper Daily Telegraph, British nationals teaching in Hong Kong's international K-12 schools expressed frustration and confusion, mulling resignation while reexamining their lessons as the new school year begins. With the new national security law that intends to criminalize anything "the authorities deem to be terrorism, secession, subversion, or foreign collusion", many teachers were told by their school administrators to maintain a neutral presence on social media and in real life. In addition, they were reminded that their students' families may have ties with China or may be Hong Kong government officials who decry the year-long pro-democracy protests. One teacher said that she had considered canceling a unit on peaceful protests, in which Rosa Parks from the United States' civil rights movements in the 1960s, would have been used as an example. Another teacher reported to have sought advice on how to present the 1989 Tiananmen Square protests and massacre factually without stepping over the new red line. 48% of protest-related arrestees are under 18 years of age.

==== National security law effect: academic and speech freedom threatened in a new school year ====
Many incidents, large and small, have occurred since the enactment of the Hong Kong national security law that affect the education sector from K-12 to higher education. For example, days after the enactment of the law, "sensitive" books were removed from libraries and students were banned from expressing their political views or participate in political protests. Later in July, tenured Hong Kong University associate law professor Benny Tai was fired by the university's governing council and against the recommendation of the university's senate, for his involvement in the 2014 Umbrella movement and his anti-China stance. At the same time, social worker, lawmaker, and pro-democracy activist Shiu Ka-chun was told that he will no longer be teaching at Hong Kong Baptist University (HKBU) due to him being too "high profile". Many university campus newspaper journalists are confused if "covering a story" could be seen as "promoting" and therefore drawing national security concerns, leading to censoring their own work due to fear. At the secondary level, concerned groups of teachers and educators urged Education Secretary Kevin Yeung in an open letter recently to not censor textbook contents and "hinder students from independent thinking and stifle free thought" after several textbook publishers "revised content in eight sets of Liberal Studies textbooks following a voluntary screening conducted by the Education Bureau". To start off the school year, on September 1, a 16-year-old boy from Heung To High School was suspended for a week for his “Liberate Hong Kong” avatar icon, a phrase deemed “seditious” by the Hong Kong Education Bureau under the new national security law. The student complied with the school's request and removed such photo from his profile picture within minutes. Nonetheless, the school demanded that the student withdraw for damaging the school's reputation. If the student chose to stay he would have two “demerits” listed on his permanent record. After the one-week suspension the student told reporters that Heung To administration threatened expulsion if he were found participating in any anti-government political events in any shape and form. A Heung To teacher told reporters that the consequence was really lenient and that the student could find another school if he were unhappy with the school or the punishment. Finally, citing national security law, Heung To reported this incident to the Education Bureau for further investigation and evaluation. In a response to the Stand News, Education Bureau stated that school campuses are not the place for political activism and all schools can do a better job ameliorating the anti-government mindset common in youth.

=== 3 September ===
==== Hong Kong-born Japanese journalist arrested by Hong Kong Police ====
Awaiting confirmation from the Japanese embassy, Japanese newspaper The Sankei News reported that one of its staff, a male photographer, could be one of the 15 arrested by police on 31 August in the Prince Edward station attack one-year commemoration protest. The journalist reportedly had been seen at numerous protests over the past year, and was once arrested at the Siege of the Hong Kong Polytechnic University. Police later stated that the journalist, a Hong Kong born Japanese citizen, had been working as a freelance reporter at the time when he was again arrested. They further stated that he had not told the police at the scene about him being a reporter and that police had not been able find evidence in his belongings to prove him to be one. He was arrested for illegal possession of an airsoft gun, and released on bail by 3 September pending further investigation.

=== 4 September ===
==== International response: United Nations ====
A 14-page report made by the United Nations dated September 1 and made available today decried Beijing's newly enacted Hong Kong national security law as being in breach of international legal obligations. The report listed out the committee's deep concerns over the ambiguous language in the national security law and the violations of Universal Declaration of Human Rights (UDHR) and the International Covenant on Civil and Political Rights (ICCPR). The committee report concluded with six actionable requests to China and Hong Kong governments, such as: explain how the legislation is compatible with the government's "obligations under articles 2, 14, 15, 17, 19, 20, 21, 22 of the ICCPR and articles 11, 12, 19 and 20 of the UDHR and how it may remediate the aforementioned inconsistencies with international human rights standards enshrined in the Act" and "provide information on how your Government intends to enforce the extra-territorial jurisdiction of the legislation as enshrined in articles 36, 37, 38, and 55 to ensure compatibility with the ICCPR."

=== 5 September ===
==== Apple's statement on Hong Kong iCloud user data storage ====
Days after Beijing passed the Hong Kong national security law, international tech giants such as Google, Twitter, Microsoft and Facebook have already declared that they would not comply with Hong Kong or mainland Chinese authorities' requests for user data. However, with its China data center being state-run, tech company Apple has not made any statements to the public until today. "iCloud data for Hong Kong users is stored on US servers," Apple stated, and therefore "any request from Hong Kong authorities to hand over the data must first be approved by the U.S. Justice Department and a warrant must be issued by a U.S. federal judge before handing it over." Apple also further released some statistics relating to user data request: "Hong Kong authorities made 604 requests for device information, 310 requests for financial data, and 10 requests for user account data during 2019." Data from July 2020, since the enactment of the national security law, will be released in the next transparency report.

=== 6 September ===
==== The 12 detainees are denied lawyers; may be sentenced to prison for life ====
It has been over 15 days since the arrest of the 12 Hong Kong pro-democracy activists, aged 16–30, and little is yet released by authorities. Hong Kong Police claimed to know little about the legal process or timeline. Carrie Lam said on September 1 that Hong Kong government would do its part to protect Hong Kong citizens, but if illegal activities occur in other judiciary region then of course Hong Kong cannot intervene. A Sha Tin district representative has initiated a White House petition pleading that Hong Kong government make sure these 12 detainees be released and returned ton Hong Kong, citing precarious human rights practices by the Chinese authorities and the scarcity of information. Netizens started a hashtag "#save12hkyouths" hoping to spread awareness of the black-box operation of Chinese government under the national security law in Hong Kong. It is now known that one of the arrestees was Andy Li (李宇軒), a member of the Hong Kong localist group "Hong Kong Story" who was also arrested on August 10, the day Jimmy Lai and Agnes Chow were arrested by Hong Kong Police citing the national security law. As of 6 September these 12 individuals were detained in Shenzhen's Yantian District Detention Center. Multiple Chinese lawyers representing the detainees' families have requested to meet with the detainees but were all declined by Chinese authorities on the ground of "relationship (with detainees) cannot be verified". One lawyer then visited the Yantian police station hoping to learn more. According to one police official it is highly probable that these individuals could be charged with "smuggling ring head" instead of the originally presumed "unlawful border crossing (into mainland China)", a lesser crime. If convicted with smuggling-related charges these detainees could be sentenced to 2 years to life in prison.

==== Arrest of Tam Tak-chi ====
In the morning, political figure and radio personality Tam Tak-chi was arrested at his Tai Po home by national security officers for "uttering seditious words" at street booths earlier in the year. According to senior police superintendent Li Kwai-wah, Tam's speeches "brought into hatred and contempt of the government and raised discontent and disaffection among Hong Kong people".

==== Protests on original date of postponed LegCo election ====
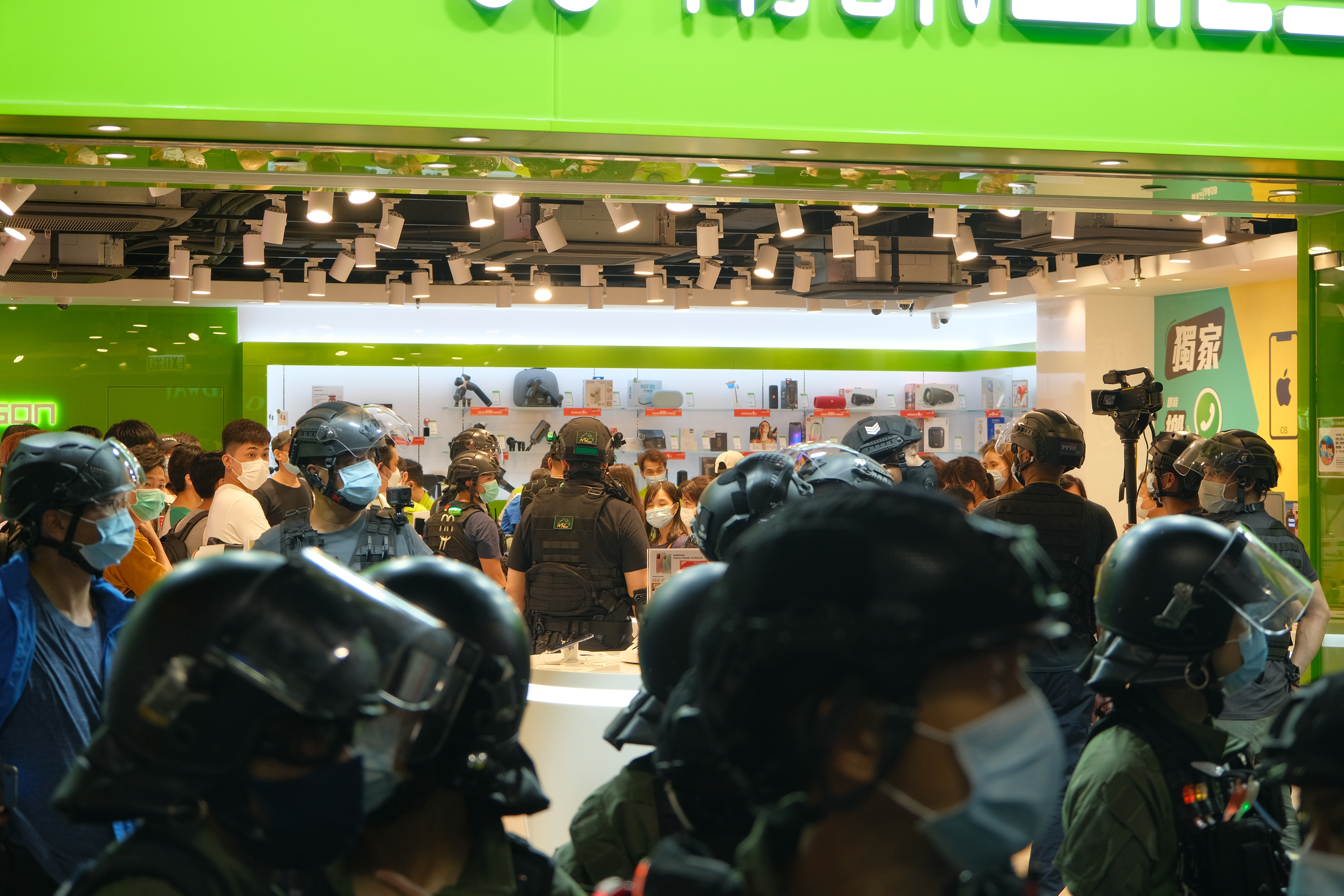
In the evening, 30 customers in the Wilson store on Sai Yeung Choi Street South were unable to leave. Police officers entered and searched them

There were protests in Kowloon on the day that the Legislative Council election was originally scheduled to be held. Nearly 300 were arrested for alleged illegal assembly, with one woman arrested under the national security law for allegedly chanting "pro-independence slogans". Some protesters hurled objects at the police, while police officers fired pepper balls. Police officers also reportedly pepper-sprayed citizens who scolded the police. Three members of the League of Social Democrats – Leung Kwok-hung, Raphael Wong and Figo Chan – were among those arrested.

A video of Hong Kong Police officers tackling a 12-year-old girl went viral online. The girl's mother said that the family lives in the area and they were shopping for art supplies. When the police approached the girl, she became fearful and tried to dash away, but was knocked down and tackled by officers. The girl, her brother, and a passerby were subsequently ticketed for allegedly violating the COVID-19 ban on group gatherings of more than two people. The injured siblings were sent to Kwong Wah Hospital for treatment. Hong Kong Police stated that their officers used the minimum force necessary to subdue the girl. The fines against the siblings were later dropped without explanation.

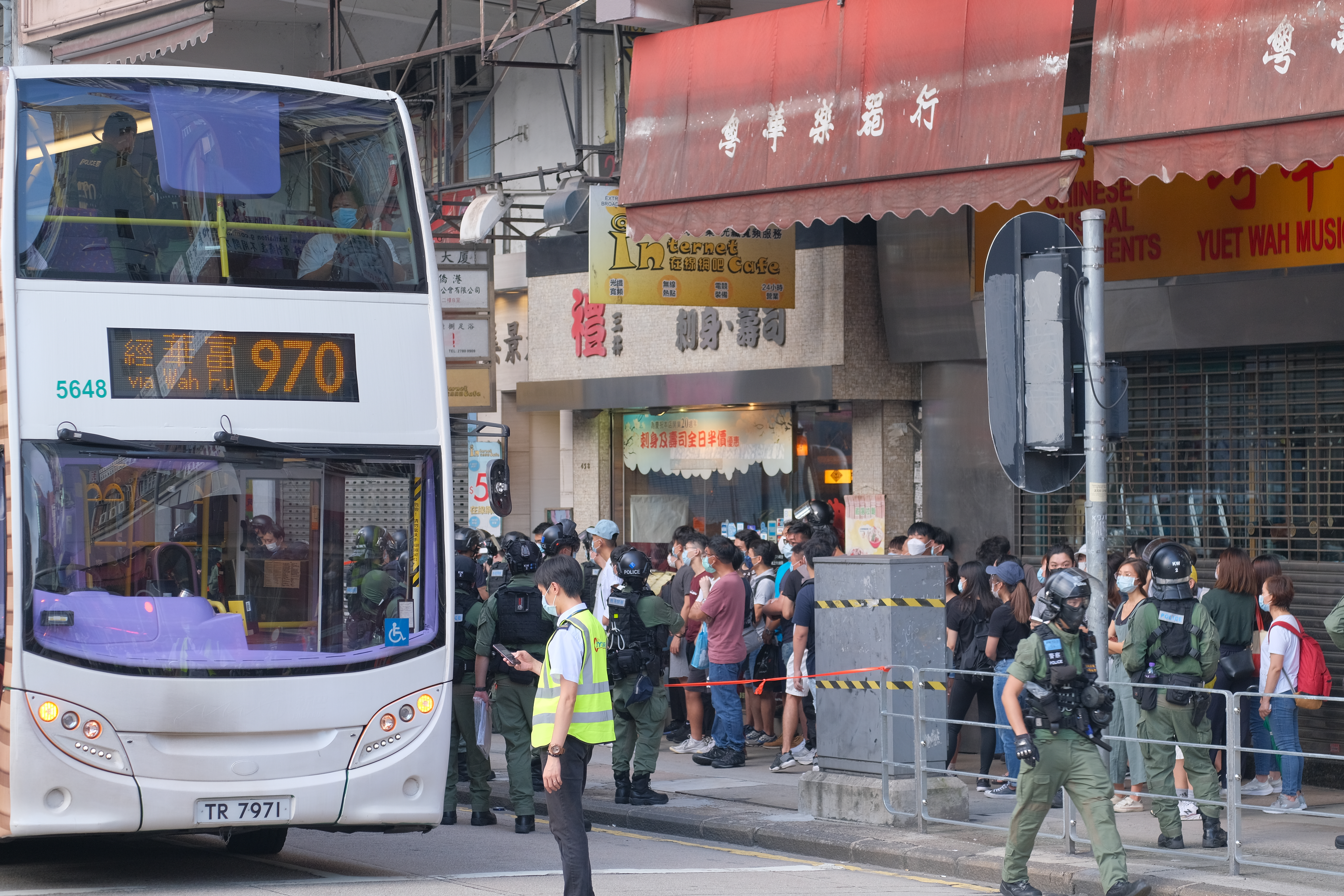
At 4:40 pm, the riot police stopped a No. 970 NWFB bus to investigate

A New World First Bus (NWFB) bus captain was arrested after honking at and driving near police officers who were gathered on the carriageway of Nathan Road. Police alleged that his "driving attitude was very dangerous" and his honking was "unreasonable". In response, members of the New World First Bus Staff Union staged a work-to-rule protest on Monday in support of their colleague, and urged NWFB to examine the bus's "black box" records.

=== 7 September ===
==== Hong Kong's separation of powers questioned ====
Article 85 of Hong Kong Basic Law states that Hong Kong courts "shall exercise judicial power independently, free from any interference." The statement that Hong Kong has never had separation of powers, neither before, nor since the handover, came from Secretary of Education Kevin Yeung on August 31, as he denied allegations of and justified the latest liberal studies textbook revisions that removed references to "Hong Kong having a division of powers between the executive, legislature and judiciary". The following day Hong Kong Chief Executive Carrie Lam reinforced Yeung's statement in a press conference, reiterating that while there should be checks and balances, "the three institutions are accountable to Beijing through an executive-led system of governance". However, the Hong Kong Bar Association's statement the next day refuted Lam and Yeung's statements while pointing out several violations of Hong Kong Basic Law if Hong Kong were to operate without separation and independence of the three powers. Regina Ip noted that Hong Kong has an independent judiciary, but that separation of powers did not exist in colonial Hong Kong as the governor appointed legislators. A government pamphlet in Chinese celebrating the Handover in June 1997 clearly stated the benefits of separation of powers, in addition to numerous liberal studies textbook editions. Today, Hong Kong Macao Affairs Office issued a statement denouncing part of the public for defending the "never existed" separation of powers, for undermining the China-appointed Chief Executive's powers, and for rejecting "Beijing's comprehensive jurisdiction over the [HK]SAR, and turn[ing] Hong Kong into an independent political entity."

=== 9 September ===
==== National security law effect: Japanese financial firm to leave Hong Kong ====
Japanese online financial firm Strategic Business Innovator, SBI Holdings, is considering moving its Hong Kong office to the Kobe and Osaka region once the 2020 business year is over in March 2021. The firm predicted that Hong Kong's status as an international hub will continue to decline in the coming months citing the Beijing-enacted national security law in Hong Kong. The company is seeking support from the Japan government's to not only relocate their office back to Japan, but to further develop Kansai region into a Hong-Kong-like international financial centre that can readily absorb financial companies fleeing Hong Kong.

==== Over 10,000 arrests since the start of the protests: Hong Kong Police Force ====
The newest arrest number released by the Hong Kong Police Force showed that of the 10,016 arrested in relation to the protests since 9 June 2019, a total of 2,210, or about 22%, were indicted on charges of "rioting, illegal assembly or possessing weapons". Additionally, police stated that of the 550 offenders who have gone through trials within this past 15 months, 462 individuals have been subject to some kind of legal consequences.

=== 10 September ===
==== International response: London, United Kingdom ====
London politician and Mayoral candidate Shaun Bailey made a motion in the London Assembly to suspend their 2006 "twinning" agreement with Beijing in response to the human rights abuse by China that undermines Hong Kong democracy and Uighurs' freedom. "The Assembly calls on the UK Government to propose a strategy to engage with China over human rights abuse, including if necessary, sanctions legislation targeted at individuals responsible. " In addition, Bailey shared an open letter with Hong Kong Free Press that detailed his plan to support Hong Kongers should they decide to emigrate to London.

==== 15 arrested for alleged Next Media stock "conspiracy to defraud and money laundering" ====
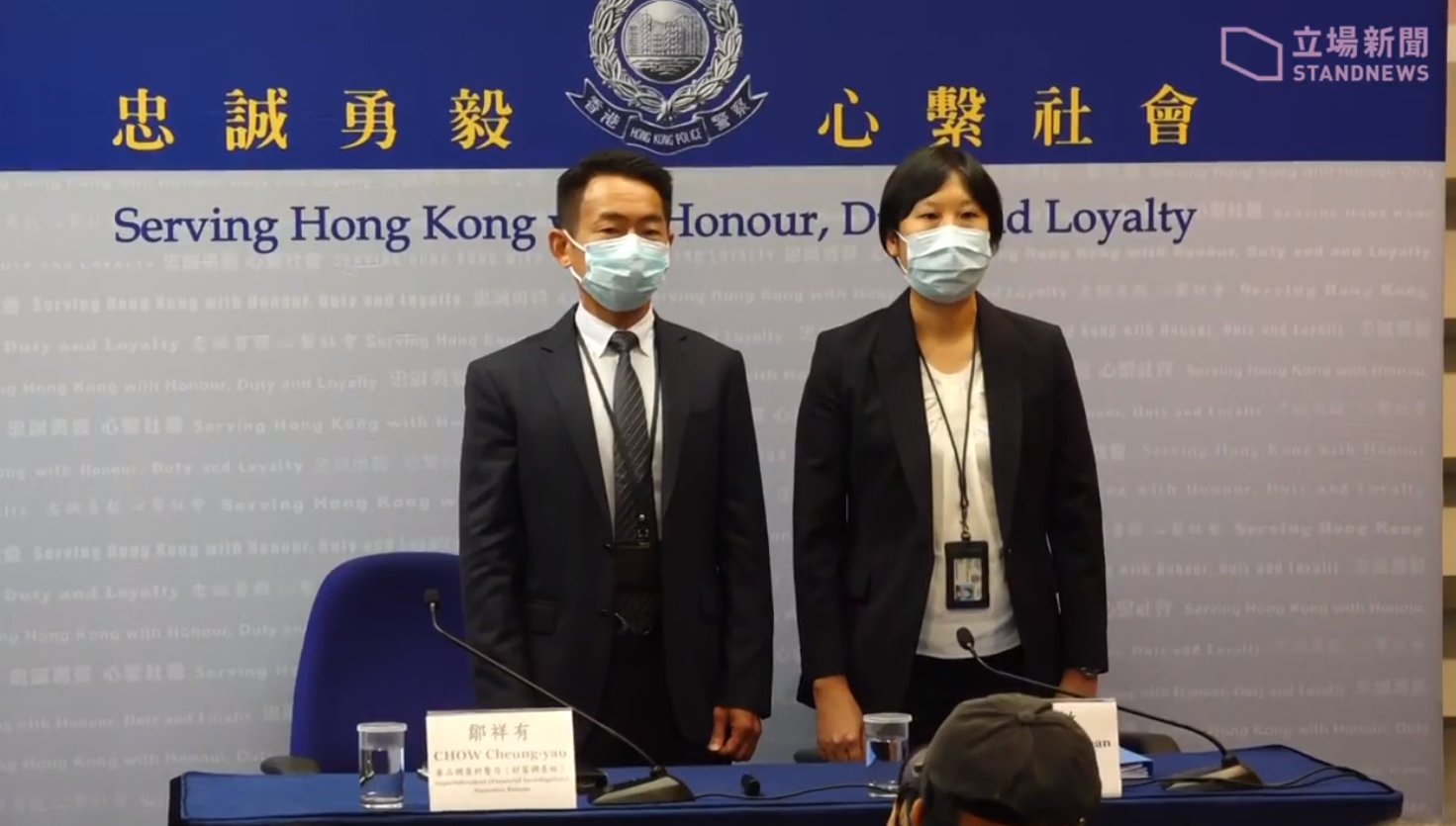
Superintendent Chow Cheung-yau (left) and Chief Superintendent Chung Wing-man (right) of the Wealth Investigation Section of the Narcotics Bureau explain the case of someone accused of manipulating Next Digital's stock price

Police arrested 15 individuals accusing them of stock manipulation from 10 to 12 August. During that period, Next Digital stock surged by almost 300%, which was seen as support of Jimmy Lai as he was being arrested at Next Media headquarters and detained for over 30 hours by the police. The Securities and Futures Commission, the SFC, had issued a statement on August 11 warning the public "to exercise extreme caution when dealing in the shares of Next Digital Limited". According to Mainichi, the 14 men and a woman are aged between 22 and 53, and were said to have conducted "some 13,200 trading transactions involving 1.69 billion shares of Next Digital" in those three days and have made about "HK$38.7 million (US$5 million), including one who made more than HK$25 million." However, not every investor profited; police cited one elderly man who had lost over $1 million HKD. Following the police's arrest of these 15 individuals, SFC further released a statement on September 11 clarifying that the agency will fully cooperate with the police investigation on money laundering of the arrested individuals.

=== 11 September ===
==== Protest-related award: Freedom House Award ====
Freedom House, a US-based non profit research and civil rights organization, announced that it awarded their annual Freedom House Award to the "leaderless, people-led" Hong Kong Pro-Democracy Movement. The award citation praised Hong Kong protesters' commitment to "defending their rights for future generations in new and creative ways" as "Beijing's sudden imposition of a repressive new national security law has made these efforts tremendously dangerous." On September 16, Nathan Law, a former Hong Kong lawmaker and prominent pro-democracy activist now wanted by Hong Kong authorities after self-exiling to London at the time the security law went into effect, will be speaking at the award ceremony.

==== National security law effect: Fraser Institute report ====
Using 2018 data, Canada-based public policy think tank Fraser Institute ranked Hong Kong as number one in "economic freedom" of the world, followed by Singapore. However, the report acknowledged that the "apparent increased insecurity of property rights and the weakening of the rule of law caused by the interventions of the Chinese government during 2019 and 2020 will likely have a negative impact on Hong Kong's score, especially in Area 2, Legal System and Property Rights, going forward." Hong Kong Chief Executive Carrie Lam welcomed the 2018 ranking but denounced its "biased comments and unfair speculations based on selective ungrounded views".

==== US Secretary of State Pompeo questioned Lam's commitment to "protecting the rights of Hong Kong residents" ====
It's been 19 days since the arrest of the 12 individuals by China coastguards. More Chinese and Hong Kong lawyers were denied access to the detainees, and some of these lawyers were even threatened by Chinese national security authorities to drop the case and not to get involved. As the Hong Kong government remained silent, the US State department issued a press release stating US's deep concern over the lack of due process for these 12 individuals and urged Chief Executive Carrie Lam to safeguard Hong Kong citizen's human rights.

=== 12 September ===
==== Press conference held by 12 detainees' families ====
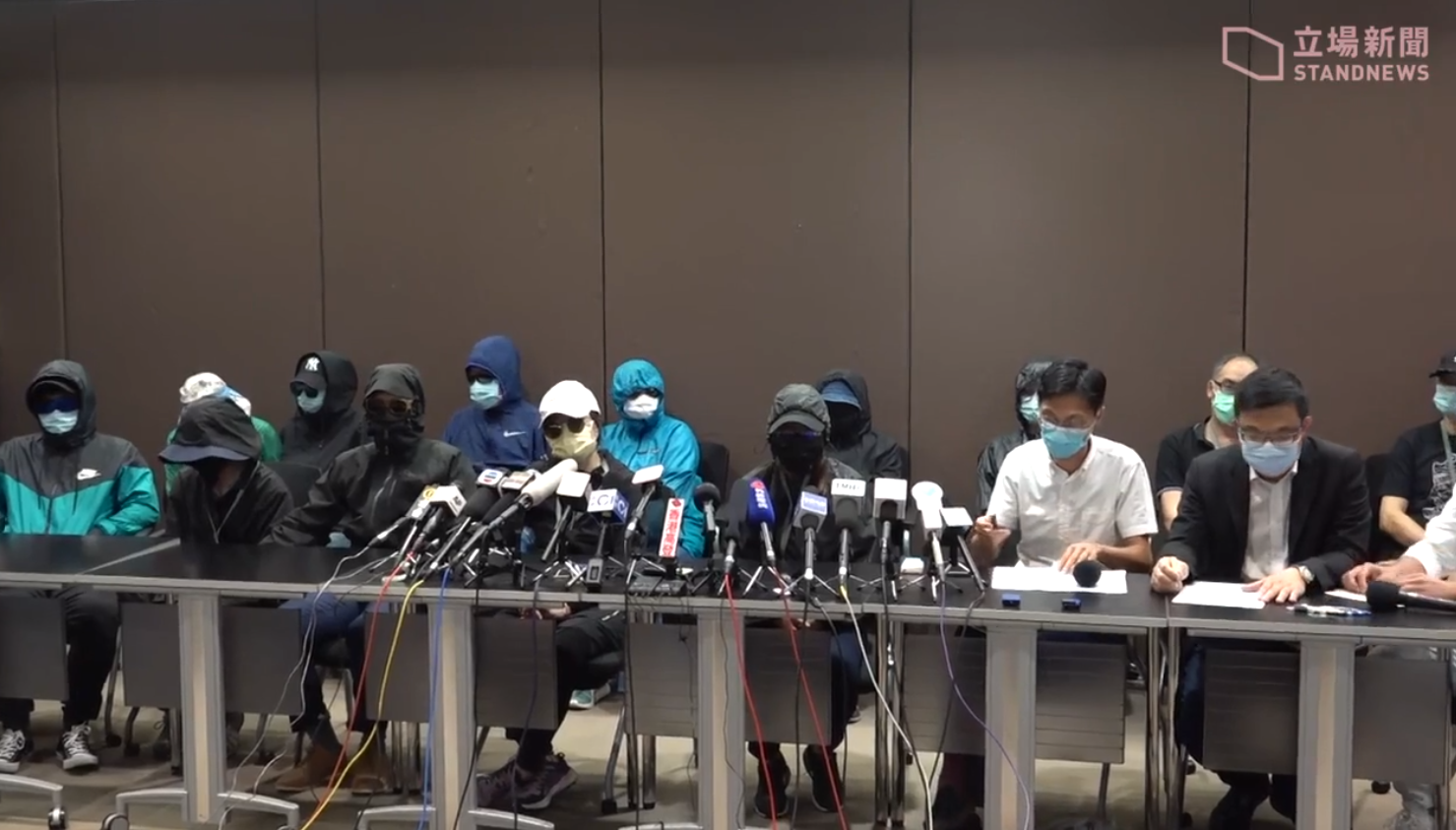
Six family members of the 12 Hong Kong activists arrested by the Guangdong Coast Guard in the South China Sea showed up, and held a press conference

After 20 days of secretive detention with zero news, the 12 families held a joint press conference stating their commitment to free their detained family members and sharing their legal obstacles when pleading with the Chinese authorities. As they seek international support to pressure China to follow international human rights protocols, they also ask the Hong Kong government to help negotiate their demands with the Chinese government. The four demands include allowing prescribed medications to be delivered and safely administered to the detainees, allowing phone calls with families, declining "state-mandated lawyers" assigned by Chinese government, and releasing these individuals to Hong Kong for a fair trial.

=== 13 September ===
==== Losing confidence in Hong Kong: increased MPF permanent withdrawal ====
The Mandatory Provident Fund (MPF) annual report showed a 32% year over year increase of Hong Kong working class withdrawing their money citing "permanent departure from Hong Kong", a move that strongly implicated possible emigration to another country, and a sign of citizens losing confidence in the Hong Kong government. The report year recorded MPF investment activities from June 2019 to June 2020, and thus included the mass anti-extradition protests. Over six billion HKD was withdrawn, comparing to 4.6 billion HKD withdrawn on the same ground in fiscal year 2018–19.

==== Yantian confirmed 12 detainees' detention; Chinese diplomat called 12 detainees "separatists" ====
After the detainees' family press conference yesterday pleading Hong Kong government's intervention and possible extradition, Shenzhen's Yantian detention center officially confirmed, for the first time, that the 12 detainees are indeed located at Yantian. Meanwhile, Chinese foreign ministry spokeswoman Hua Chunying publicly stated on Twitter that these 12 detainees are criminals trying to "separate Hong Kong from China", a more serious allegation than the "illegal border crossing", and an allegation punishable under the new national security law. The Hong Kong government reaffirmed its stance to not interfere with China's jurisdiction, claiming that the relevant crime "falls within the jurisdiction of the mainland and the special administrative region government respects and will not interfere with law enforcement actions." Meanwhile, more lawyer visits have been denied by authorities, and numbers of lawyers have quit taking on the case under political pressure from Chinese government.

=== 14 September ===
==== International response: EU-China follow-up summit ====
A virtual meeting between leaders of the European Union – president of European Council Charles Michel, president of the European Commission Ursula von der Leyen, and German chancellor Angela Merkel, with Michel as the chair for the EU side – and Chinese leader Xi Jinping took place on 14 September, as a follow-up to the 22nd EU-China summit that took place on 22 June. After the meeting, Michel released an official statement in which he spoke of "grave concerns" regarding the national security law, calling on China to "keep their promises to the people of Hong Kong and the international community", and reiterating that "democratic voices in Hong Kong should be heard, rights protected, and autonomy preserved".

==== International response: Nine parliamentarians and experts call for stronger European stance on China ====
Nine European parliamentarians published an op-ed in French and German newspapers calling for a stronger European stance on China, referencing the violation of Hong Kong's semi-autonomous status as one reason for their call for more EU support for Taiwan. They termed Chinese authorities' responses to last year's protests in Hong Kong as “coercion, control, and subjugation.”

=== 15 September ===
==== National security law effect: US increased travel advisory to Hong Kong ====
The United States increased its Hong Kong travel advisory to Level 3, "reconsider travel", citing how the Chinese government "arbitrarily enforces local laws, including by carrying out arbitrary and wrongful detentions and through the use of exit bans on U.S. citizens and citizens of other countries without due process of law" since the imposition of the Hong Kong national security law on July 1. In response to the heightened travel alert, Chinese foreign ministry spokesperson Wang Wenbin said to reporters that "China has always protected the safety and legal rights of foreigners in China in accordance with law. China is one of the safest countries in the world," but foreigners in China also "have an obligation to abide by Chinese laws."

==== National security law effect: another pro-democracy activist fled Hong Kong citing safety concerns ====
Pro-democracy activist Sunny Cheung confirmed his departure from the city after he failed to show up to court for his June 4 Tienanmen Massacre commemoration vigil arrest. Cheung told reporters in August that he and his family had been harassed and monitored; previously, pro-democracy activists such as Agnes Chow and Joshua Wong had likewise reported that they had been stalked or subjected to surveillance by unknown individuals.

=== 16 September ===
==== International response: USA and United Kingdom ====
US Secretary of State Mike Pompeo met with UK Foreign Secretary Dominic Raab in Washington, D.C., to discuss trade, Brexit, and China. Pompeo praised the United Kingdom for "remarkable work speaking up for the people of Hong Kong" and its new immigration policy for Hongkongers, while Raab talked about "very serious human rights abuses" that Hongkong along with the Uyghurs in Xinjiang were subject to. Raab also said that the UK would be "watching very carefully" how the national security law would be applied in the coming months.

=== 17 September ===
==== Protest-related award: the Havel Prize ====
The Václav Havel International Prize for Creative Dissent celebrates activists who "exhibit bravery, creativity, and artistic innovation in standing up against dictatorships." One of three award recipient this year was Australia-based exiled Chinese political cartoonist Badiucao, who continues to support Hong Kong's pro-democracy movement with countless pieces of protest artwork. According to the award description, Badiucao's creation "Lennon Flag" served as a "powerful protest symbol that inspired and mobilized the global community to stand in solidarity with Hong Kong's pro-democracy movement." While the award winners were announced on September 17, the virtual award ceremony will take place on September 25 during the 2020 Oslo Freedom Forum. The forum features Nathan Law, an exiled Hong Kong pro-democracy politician and activist wanted by Hong Kong authorities.

=== 18 September ===
==== International response: United Kingdom ====
In a speech to a parliamentary committee, UK Prime Minister Boris Johnson said that people in Hong Kong and around the world began to see "the chilling of free speech, [people are] starting to see...the effect of that security rule, the Chinese legislation, already starting to bite on the people of Hong Kong". It is speculated that Johnson was referring to the recent Tam Tak-chi arrest for "uttering seditious words".

==== National security law effect: Australian judge resigned from Hong Kong court ====
The September 18 Hong Kong government gazette announced that effective September 2, Hong Kong Chief Executive Carrie Lam had revoked the appointment of Judge James Spigelman. In an interview with Australian broadcaster ABC, Spigelman stated that he had resigned from serving on the Court of Final Appeal citing reasons related to the content of the national security legislation. The Chief Executive office downplayed the matter by stating that Spigelman had not given reasons for his resignation.

=== 19 September ===
==== Hong Kong officials on the 12 detainees; families responded ====
Secretary of Security John Lee acknowledged in a TVB interview that Hong Kong authorities were only being informed of the detainment five days after, and that all 12 detainees were in good health. He further stated that these detainees had already chosen their lawyers provided by China. Separately on a radio interview, Chief Secretary Matthew Cheung Kin-chung, said that "Hong Kong's Immigration Department, and the Hong Kong Economic and Trade Office in Guangdong had communicated with the families 80 times since the arrests" but claimed their hands are tied. However, families of the detainees accused the government of never having contacted the family members in the past 28 days, and "only shirked responsibility and confused the public with mere excuses”. Two families' members revealed to news reporters in a press conference the following day that they had separately gone to the police stations to report their missing sons, on August 26 and on August 28. While the missing person reports were not accepted by police, one policeman showed a record of the missing person's cellphone record to the family member, raising questions on how the records were obtained two days after the capture but three days before the news broke. The other family member was told that the son was now detained in Yantian, days before the detention location was reported by media. Family members asked the Hong Kong government to provide clear and accurate evidence of the maritime location, to provide a recent photo of each detainee, and to let the captured know the families have appointed lawyers for them.

=== 20 September ===
==== “Lunch with you” and “Dine with you” localized protests continue ====
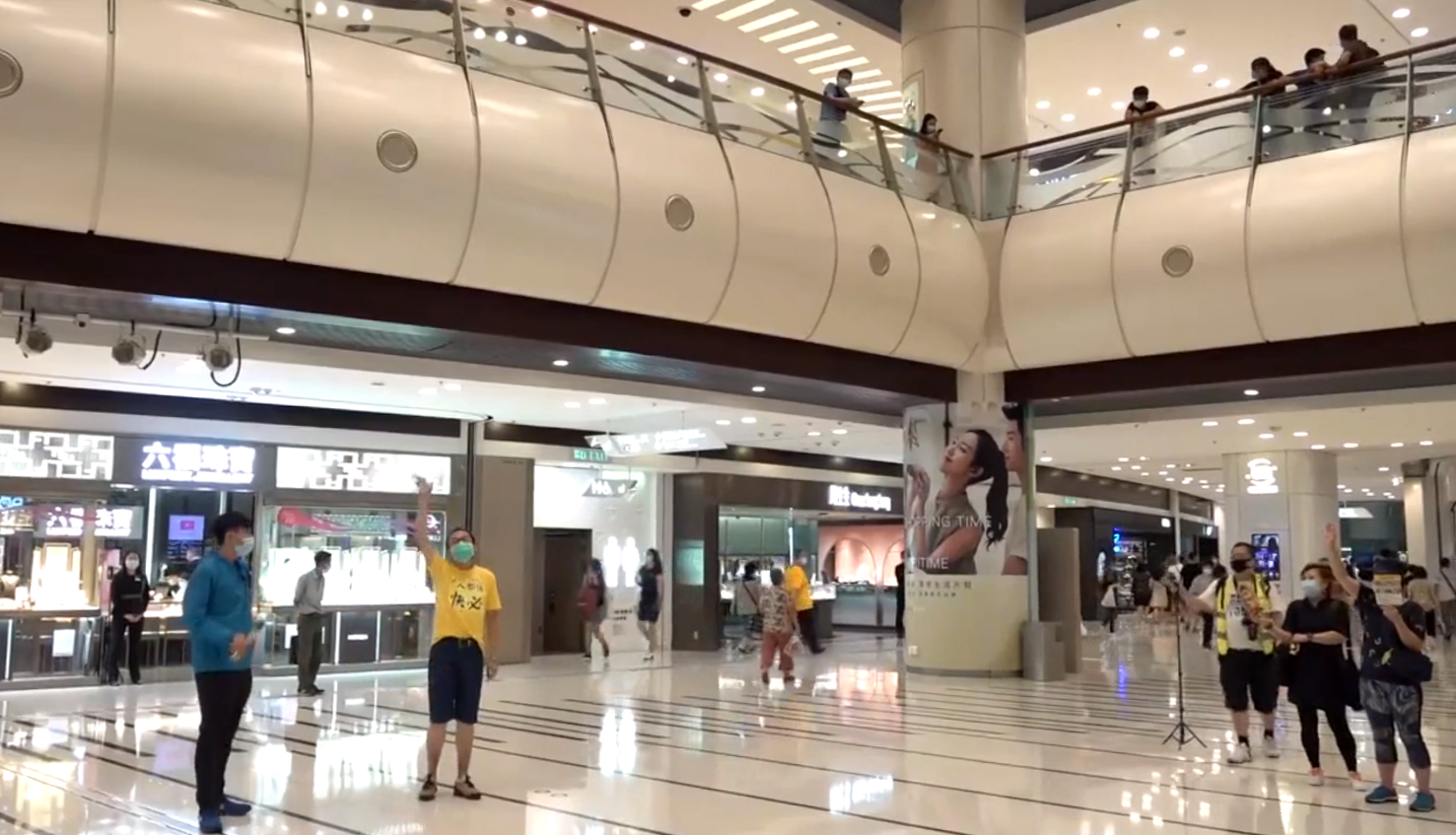
At night in the atrium of Tsing Yi City, "Lunch brother" David Li and a middle-aged man wearing a yellow shirt and writing "Everyone must be fast" arrived at the scene

These protest events usually take place around lunch and dinner time and inside local malls. Although since the enactment of national security law along with the pandemic the number of participants and frequency have dramatically declined, these protests, nonetheless, continue to take place despite heavier police presence. For example, a “Lunch With You” was organized on August 21 at 1 pm in Yuen Long YOHO Mall and in Yuen Long MTR station to commemorate the 13th month remembrance of the 2019 Yuen Long attack. The YOHO protesters began chanting slogans while the other group began marching into Yuen Long's Nam Pin Wai (南邊圍), the reported gathering spot of white-shirt attackers in the 2019 Yuen Long attack. Both locations had heavy police presence. In the evening, at Maritime Square in Tsing Yi, dozens of protesters came out and chanted the protest slogan “five demands not one less”. They showed solidarity with paper cut-outs of "Fast Beat" Tam Tak-chi, a legislative council member who had been arrested earlier on sedition charges and denied bail. Participants waved their cellphone flashlights in support of Tam and the protest. Hundreds of police arrived soon after. No arrest was made.

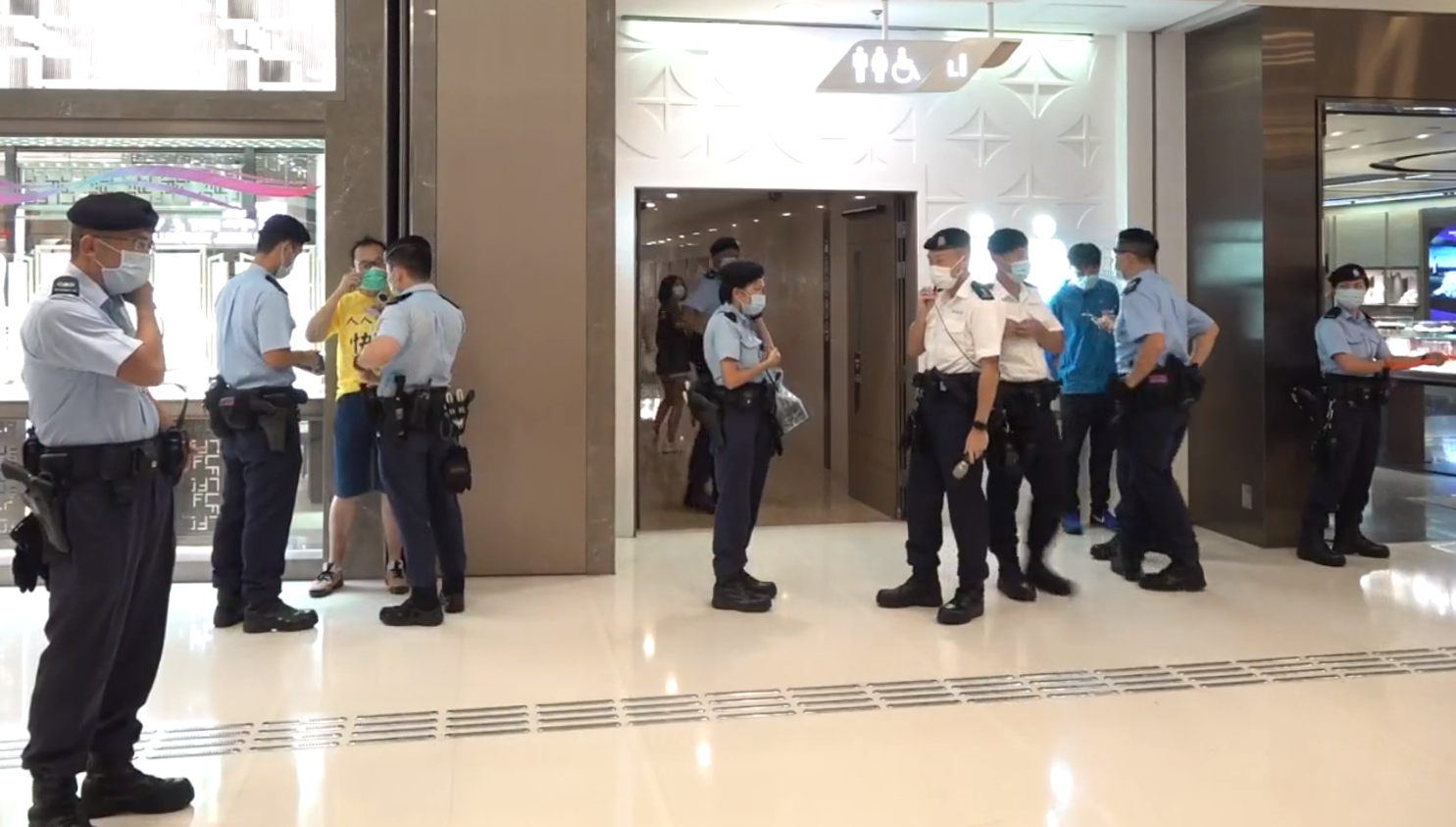
A large number of police officers entered the mall and set up a cordon at the entrance and exit of the bathroom

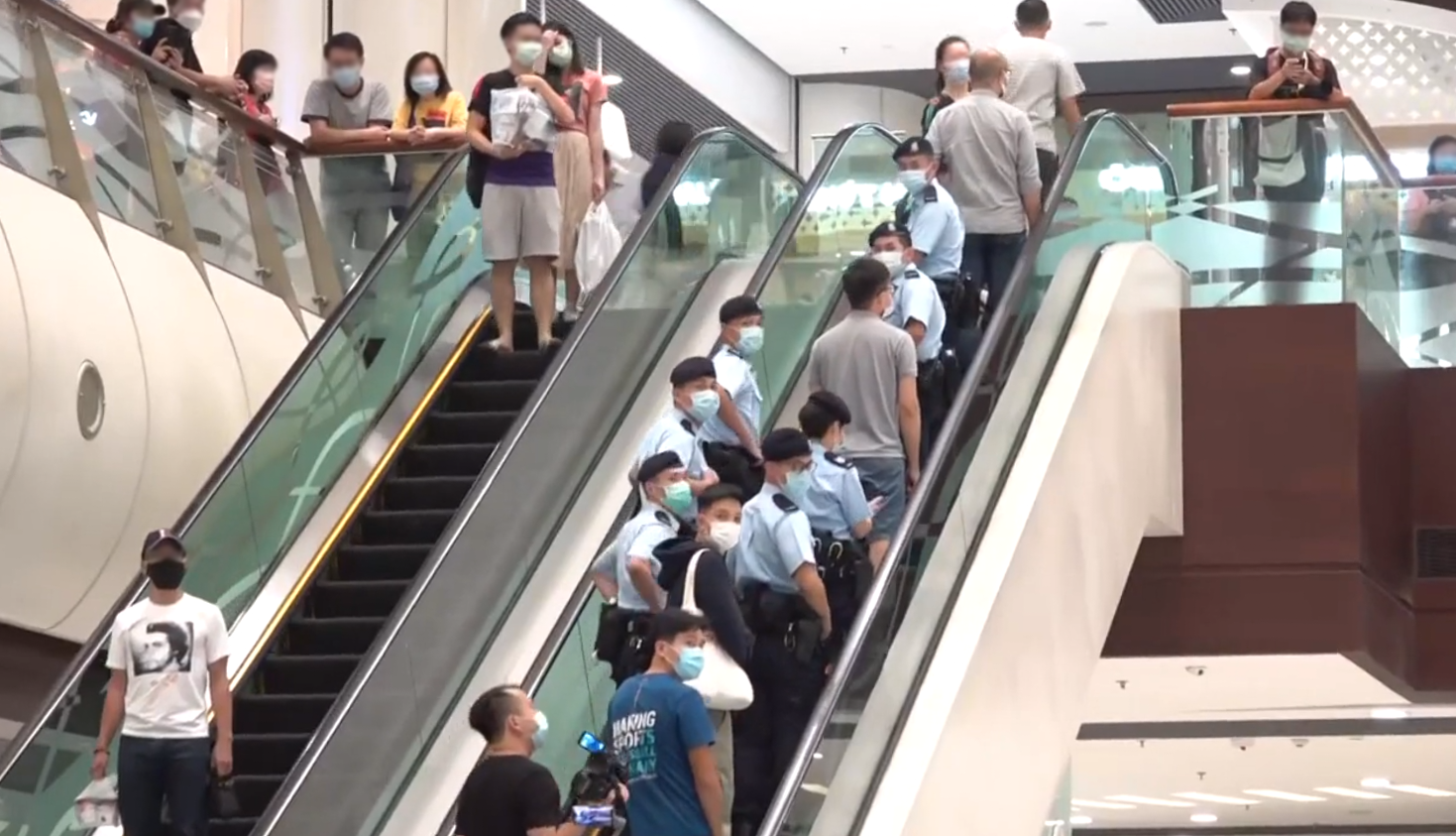
The officers went up to the second floor

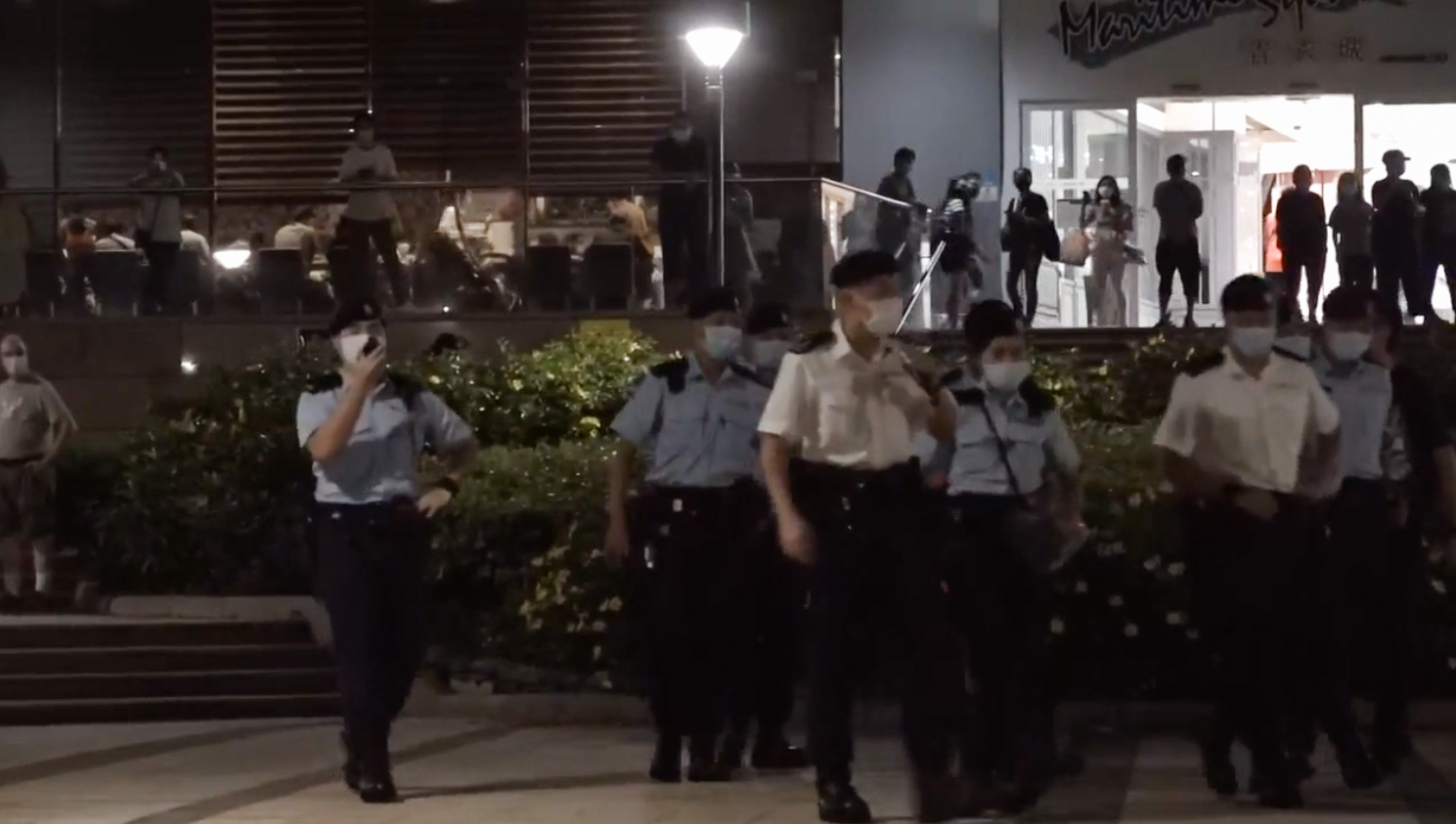
Police officers are preparing to intercept and search people at the waterfront location

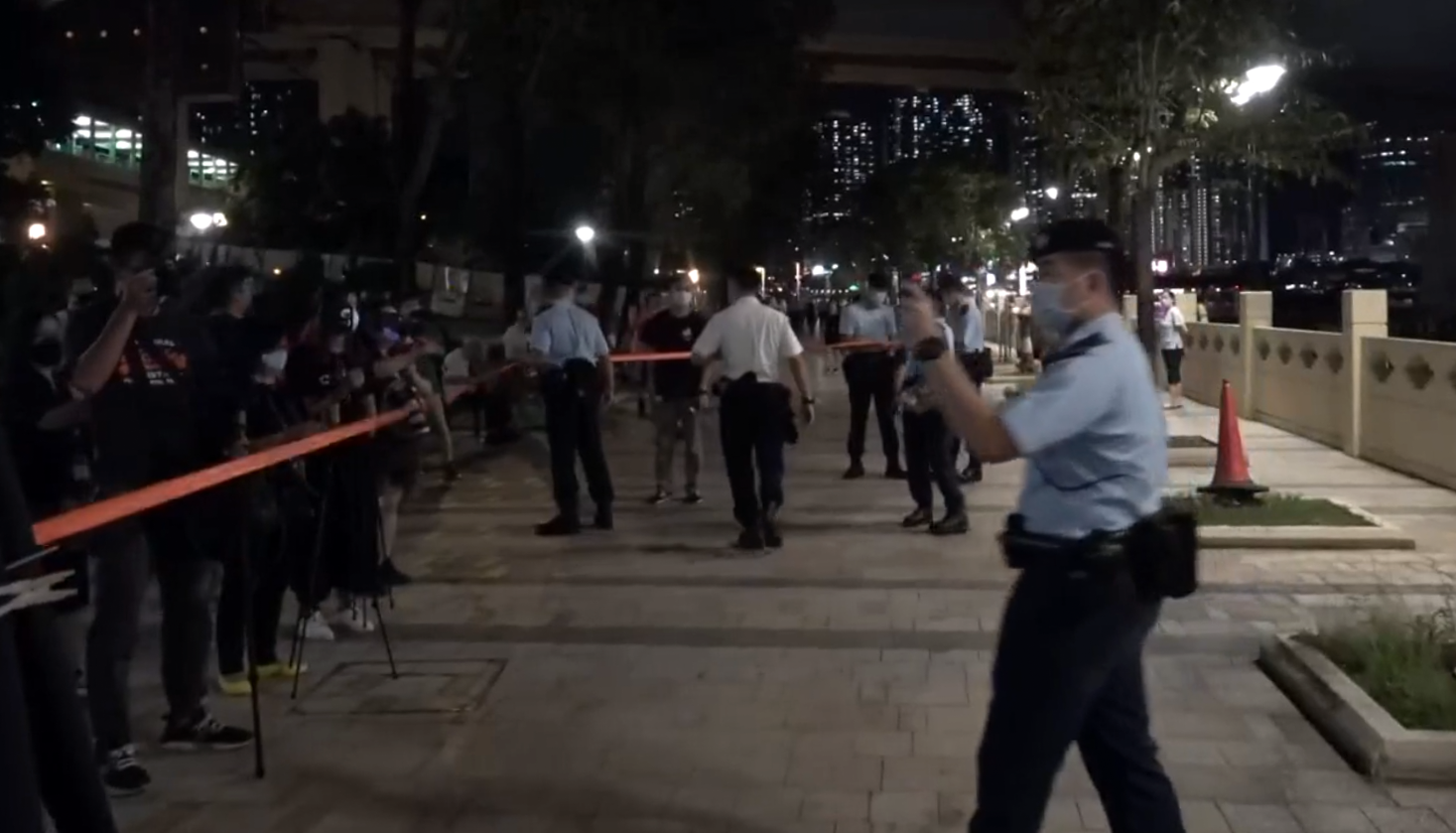
Police officers fenced off the waterfront, and there were police officers taking pictures of people present

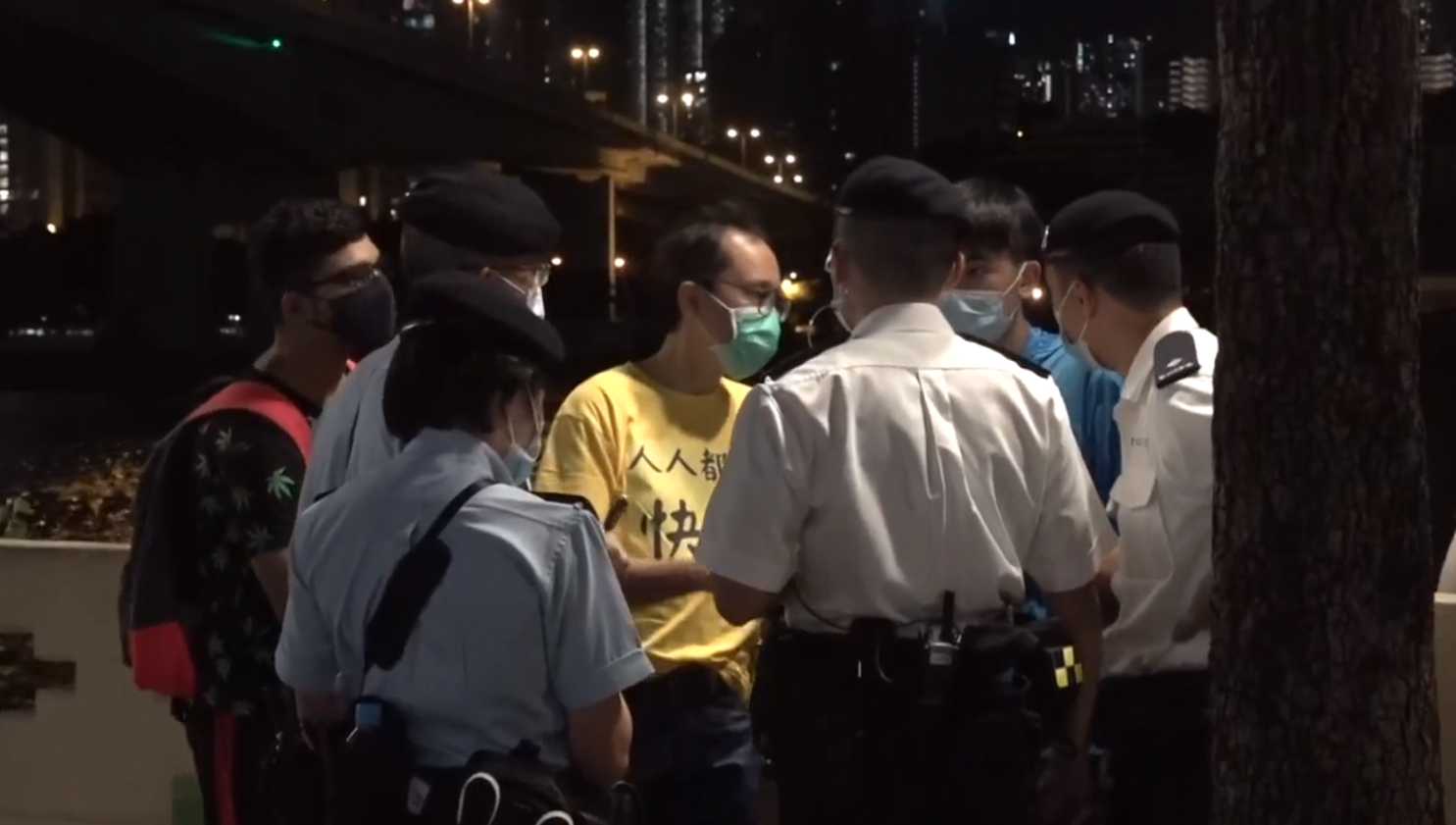
Three people were intercepted on the waterfront

=== 21 September ===
This vertical protest banner was a response to Hong Kong government's decision to postpone the much anticipated Legislative Council election for a year. The original election was dated September 6, 2020. This 20-meter vertical protest banner, printed on black fabric with white fonts, was found flying over Devil's Peak on Kowloon. The six Chinese characters on the banner demanded the government to "Initiate Legislative Council Election Now" (「立即啟動選舉」).

=== 22 September ===
==== National security law effect: man arrested for slogan chanting ====
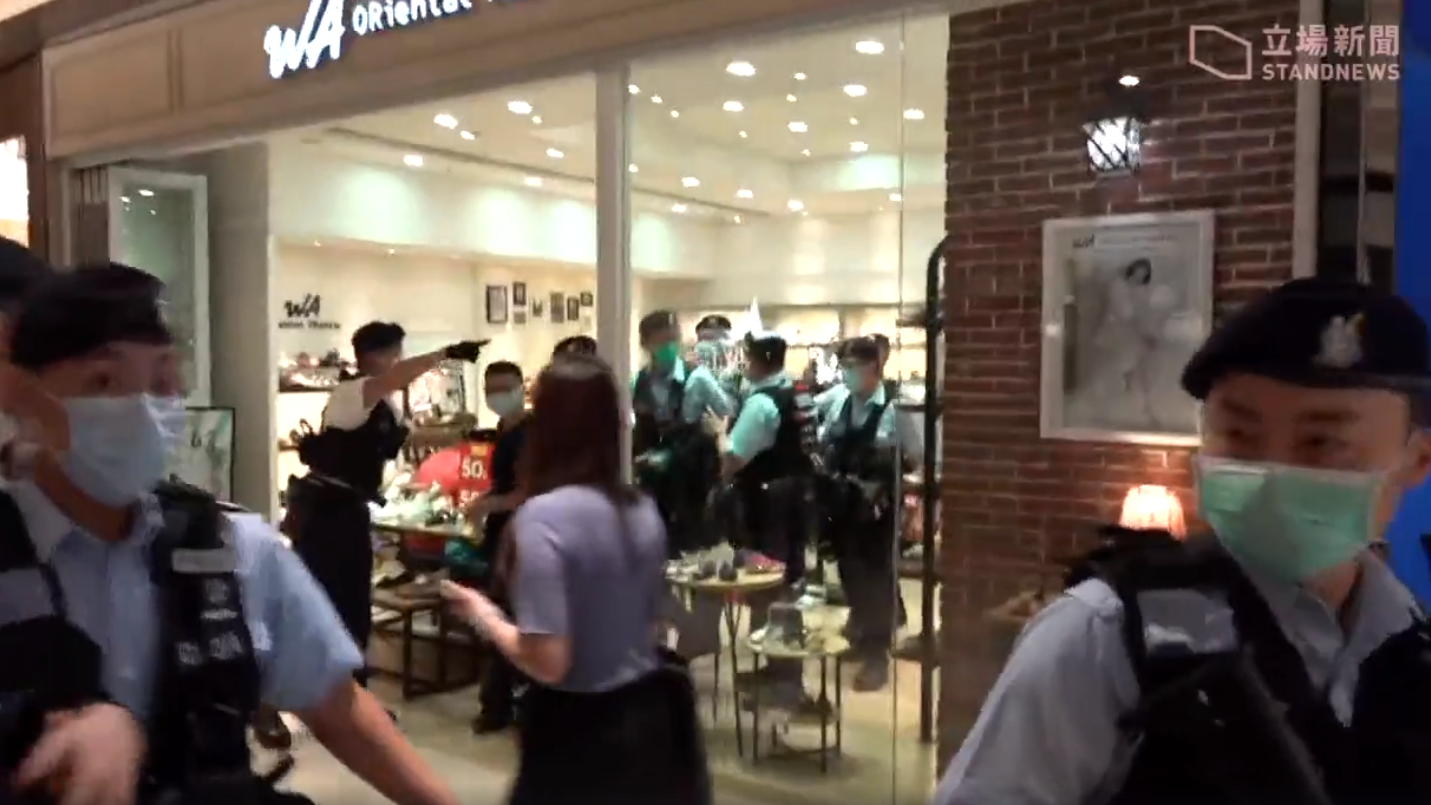
A protester surnamed Ma was taken away by multiple police officers in a shoe store in PopCorn Mall, Tseung Kwan O

The 30-year-old protester was chanting "Liberate Hong Kong, the revolution of our time" in Tseung Kwan O PopCorn shopping center as Hong Kong citizens gathered to commemorate the one year passing of Christy Chan Yin-lam. His arrest became the 27th arrest in Hong Kong under the national security law since its enactment on July 1. It is speculated that this protester, surname Ma, dressed as "Captain America" in numerous protest rallies and is also the administrator of a popular anti-government Telegram channel.

=== 23 September ===
==== International response to pro-democracy activist Joshua Wong's new arrest ====
Joshua Wong was arrested by the police at the station for wearing a mask and unlawful assembly in an October 2019 protest. While Wong was released after being questioned for about three hours, these new charges became his third arrest by the authorities. British Foreign Secretary Dominic Raab urged Chinese and Hong Kong authorities to "respect the rights and freedoms of the people of Hong Kong, as protected in the Joint Declaration". The European Union spokesperson issued a statement questioning China's "will to uphold its international commitments" as this arrest becomes the "latest in a troubling series of arrests of pro-democracy activists since the summer" when the national security law was enacted by the Chinese government. Human Rights Watch also issued a statement calling on Hong Kong authorities to stop prosecuting pro-democracy activists.

=== 24 September ===
==== National security law effect: Danish pension fund divests China investment citing Hong Kong human rights violation ====
Akademiker Pension, Denmark's first pension company formerly known as MP Pension, will divest around 400 million Danish Krone, about 62 million US Dollars, from Chinese government bonds and shares. Citing Hong Kong's national security law and Uighurs' detention camps as human rights violations, Akademiker Pension stated that they have long "had China under observation" and that the company can no longer turn a blind eye to China's systematical violations of human rights.

==== Swedish technology firm cut ties with Hong Kong Government, citing US Hong Kong sanction ====
An email by Stockholm-based Micro Systemation AB (MSAB) to Bloomberg confirmed that the MSAB will no longer provide cellphone data extraction services to the Hong Kong Police's Cyber Security and Technology Crime Bureau (CSTCB) or other Hong Kong government agencies under the United States' July 14 sanction. In July, pro-democracy activist Joshua Wong raised international attention when urging technology companies to stop selling phone hacking technology to Hong Kong and mainland China. A court document provided by the police during one of Wong's trials showed that Hong Kong police used software bought from Israel-based company Cellebrite to hack not only Wong's phone but over 4,000 Hong Kong activists' phone data. In August, Cellebrite responded that the company does not have business ties with governments sanctioned by the US.

==== Sentencing of three protesters in relation to New Town Plaza protest, 14 July 2019 ====
Three people were sentenced to prison by a District Court judge for the offence of rioting. Two adult defendants were handed four-year jail terms, while a minor was sentenced to three years and four months' imprisonment. The three took part in clashes with police at New Town Plaza, Sha Tin, during protests there on 14 July 2020.

==== Protest-related award: Siena Drone Awards ====
Architect and photographer Tugo Cheung's aerial photo titled "2,000,001" was taken on June 16, 2019, when more than two million Hong Kong citizens took to the streets to protest the anti-extradition bill that has since been withdrawn by the government. The drone photo was selected as the runner-up in the "People" category.

=== 25 September ===
==== A new form of peaceful protest: Read With You ====
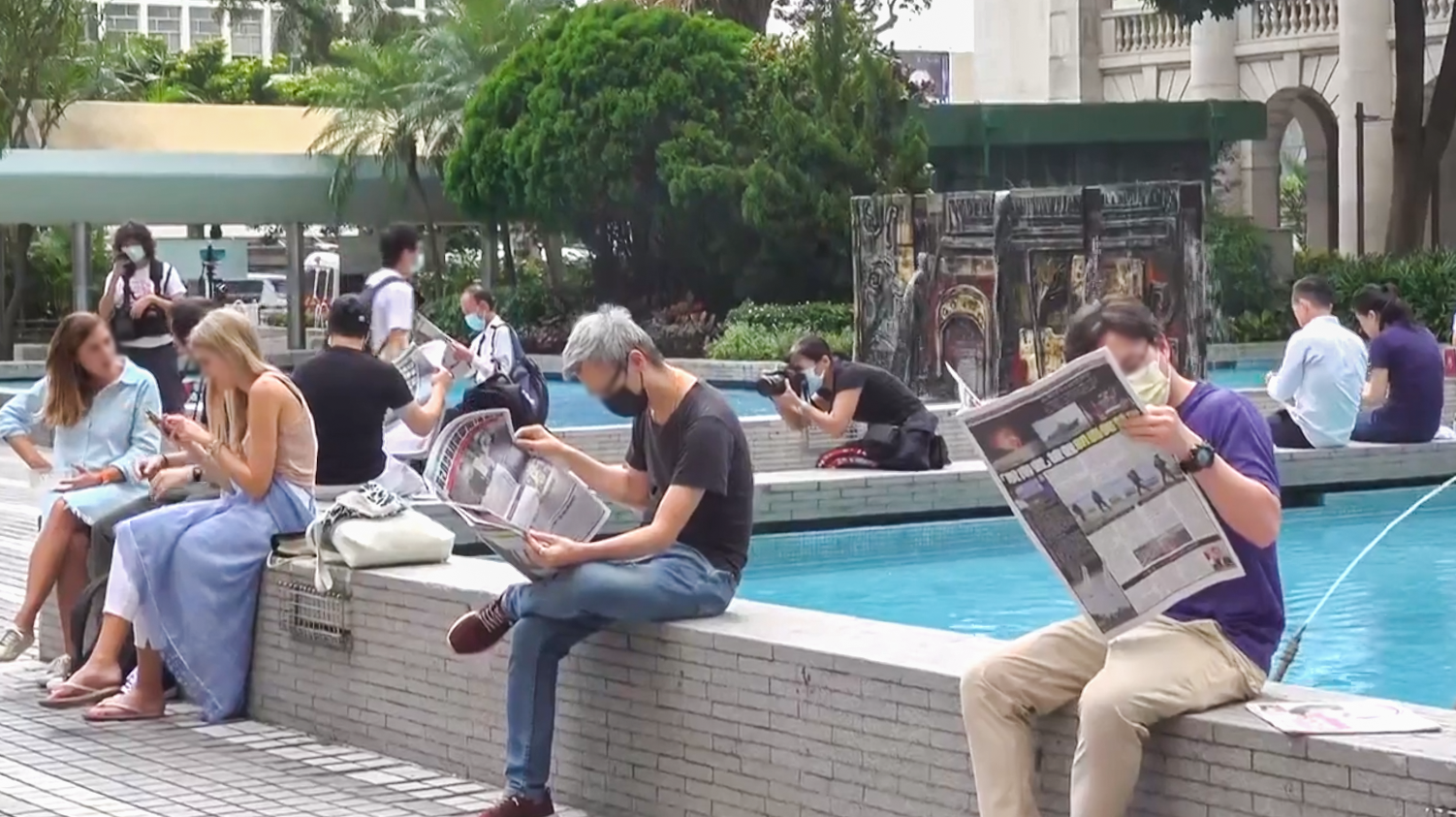
At 1 pm, citizens silently reading Apple Daily at the Statue Square in Central

Following the leaderless protest events "Lunch With you", "Sing With You", and "Dine With You" throughout Hong Kong since June 2019, a new form of peaceful protest emerged: "Read With You". In support of the only pro-democracy print newspaper Apple Daily in Hong Kong, citizens not only helped rally its stock in the stock market, especially since the arrest of founder Jimmy Lai on August 10, but also have been physically purchasing extra copies of the printed newspaper in stores and newspaper stands. Many individuals, businesses and advocacy groups have also been showing their support by placing advertisements with Apple Daily. Recently, more and more people holding a copy of the day's Apple Daily are gathering at lunch time as a form of silent protest.

==== International response: European Union ====
European Union president Charles Michel gave a speech to the United Nations General Assembly stating the Union's commitment to protecting "peaceful cooperation, human rights and fundamental freedoms." Michel further reiterated that the European Union nations "do not share the values on which the political and economic system in China is based" and will continue to promote "respect for universal human rights, including those of minorities such as the Uighurs. Or in Hong Kong, where international commitments guaranteeing the rule of law and democracy are being questioned."

==== International response: United Nations Human Rights Council ====
Several countries called out China for its human rights violations in Hong Kong and to the Xinjiang Uighurs during the 45th session of the UN human Rights Council meeting. Britain specifically called on China to "uphold the rights and freedoms in the Joint Declaration" and to respect "the independence of the Hong Kong judiciary" while other countries demanded full access to Xinjiang's Uighurs re-education camps for full investigation. China representative rejected the "baseless allegation" but did not dispute them. Two days prior, a UK-led virtual discussion on Hong Kong was held with support from Canada and Australia to help provide more context to the attending members "on how the Hong Kong National Security Law is a breach of China's international obligations".

=== 26 September ===
==== Protests continue: hill-top vertical protest banners ====
Vertical protest banners have been repeatedly displayed by Hong Kong citizens to voice their dissatisfaction with the government even before the anti-extradition protests last year. In the 2014 Umbrella Movement for the first time vertical protest banner was found on top of Lion Rock and since then, many more hill-top vertical protest banners appeared. Some well-known recent hillside banners include "Corrupted Cops are the Rioters" hung on 21 September 2019 at Devil's Peak of Yau Tong, "Disband the Police" hung on Beacon Hill in Kowloon on 23 September 2019, "One Country One System. Hong Kong Game Over" on 15 June 2020, and "Initiate Legislative Council Election Now" on 21 September 2020. With the police rejecting the mass rally application put forth by Civil Human Rights Front for 1 October, the Chinese National Day, Hong Kong citizens put out a vertical protest banner in the hills of Shau Kei Wan today. The inscription on the banner referred to the upcoming holiday using a Cantonese profanity.

=== 28 September ===
==== Second solidarity protest: Vancouver, Canada ====
For the second consecutive weekend, about 500 protesters gathered in front of Chinese Consulate Office in Vancouver to voice their opposition of Communist China's increasing presence and influence in Canada, and intrusion of India, Hong Kong, Tibet, and Xinjiang. The participating organizations were "Friend of Canada- India, Canada Tibet Committee and the Tibetan Community, Friends of Canada India Organization, Vancouver Society of Freedom, Democracy and Human Rights for China, Vancouver Hong Kong Political Activists, Vancouverites concerned about Hong Kong, Vancouver Society in Support of Democratic Movement (VSSDM) and Vancouver Uyghur Association."

=== 29 September ===
==== Police defended mass protest application rejection; suggesting "real name registration" in future rallies ====
A mass rally protest march application for the Chinese National Day on 1 October, submitted by Civil Human Rights Front (CHRF), was denied by the police, citing pandemic health concerns and threats of violence. CHRF further lost their appeal to the decision. This is the 7th time in the past few months that the Hong Kong police has rejected a mass rally application. A CHRF spokesperson, in a press conference, accused the police of violating Hong Kong Basic Law article 27, which states that Hong Kong citizens shall have freedom "of assembly, of procession and of demonstration". The Spokesperson further stated that police suggested to him that to get approval for future rallies, participants should register with their real name to gain rights and access to a march, so if anything were to happen police could quickly track down the participants. The Security Bureau also reiterated that freedom and rights are not absolute, that they are "subject to restrictions as prescribed by law in the interests of public order and safety, as well as the well-being of others." CHRF disputed that statement, accusing the government of using health concerns as an excuse to suppress Hong Kong citizen's right of assembly, especially when trains and subways are packed with commuters every day but only a mass rally is considered a health concern.

=== 30 September ===
==== International response: Germany ====
German Chancellor Angela Merkel in a speech vowed to question China on its human rights violation in Hong Kong in the next day during the EU summit, stating that Germany has "flagged up our deep concern about the development in Hong Kong. The principle of one country, two systems stands but again and again it's being undermined."

==== Developing: the 12 Hong Kong detainees charged by Chinese authorities ====
At the end of the 37-day legal limit for detention without further action, two of the 12 detainees were formally charged with organizing smuggling and the remaining 10 individuals were charged with "illegal border crossing".

==== US soon accepts "refugees" from Hong Kong seeking asylum ====
There's been effort since the establishment of the Hong Kong national security law to add Hong Kong to the US refugee resettlement program should the activists choose to flee to the US. Announced today in the US Department of State website and awaiting presidential signature, starting October 1, Hong Kong residents fleeing to the United States could apply for refugee status seeking asylum under the new refugee resettlement program along with other developing countries including Iraq, El Salvador, Guatemala, Honduras, Cuba, and Venezuela.
