= Johnson Yeung =

Hong Kong social activist (born 1991)

- 楊政賢
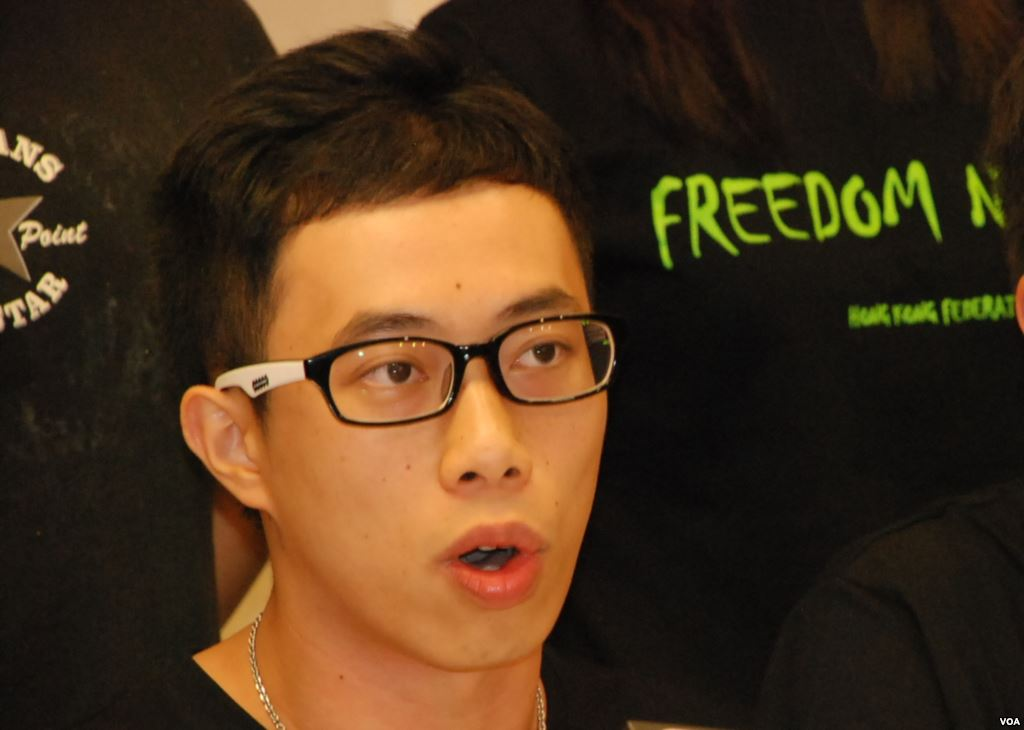

Secretary-General of the Hong Kong Federation of Students
- In office 2013–2014
- Preceded by: Ben Lam
- Succeeded by: Lester Shum

Convener of the Civil Human Rights Front
- In office October 2013 – October 2014

Personal details
- Born: 29 November 1991 (age 34) British Hong Kong
- Education: Chinese University of Hong Kong; University of Hong Kong

Johnson Yeung
- Traditional Chinese: 楊政賢
- Simplified Chinese: 杨政贤
Transcriptions
Standard Mandarin
- Hanyu Pinyin: Yáng Zhèngxián
Yue: Cantonese
- Jyutping: joeng4 zing3 jin4

Johnson Yeung Ching-yin (Chinese: 楊政賢; born 29 November 1991) is a Hong Kong pro-democracy social activist, who was former convener of the Civil Human Rights Front and Secretary-General of the Hong Kong Federation of Students.

== Early life ==
Yeung studied at Wong Shiu Chi Secondary School in his early years. He graduated from the Department of Politics and Administration at the Chinese University of Hong Kong (CUHK) in 2014. Subsequently, he obtained a Master of Laws from the University of Hong Kong in 2016. He served as the president of the CUHK Student Union and the Deputy Secretary-General at the Hong Kong Federation of Students.

== Activism ==
=== Civil Human Rights Front ===
Yeung was the former convener of the Civil Human Rights Front between 2013 and 2014. In his role, he helped to organise rallies advocating for Hong Kong's democracy. On 1 July 2014, he organised a large-scale pro-democracy march that drew over 510,000 protesters according to organisers, while the police gave an estimate of 98,600 in attendance. Yeung delivered a speech at the march and stated, "Hong Kong has had enough. We're done just fighting individual issues – we're fighting the government now, to build a society and a government that belongs to us."

On 4 July, Yeung and four other members of the Civil Human Rights Front were arrested for "obstruction" at the rally from three days ago. Yeung believed the government, led by Chief Executive Leung Chun-ying, took this action to suppress the organisers of the rallies. Later that year, Yeung joined the 2014 Hong Kong protests, participating in a series of demonstrations dubbed the Occupy Movement and the Umbrella Movement. In 2015, the police informed him there was insufficient evidence to prosecute from his earlier arrest. Yeung believed the arrest was intended as a method of intimidation.

=== Anti-extradition protests ===
Yeung joined the anti-extradition protests that occurred throughout 2019, and had spoken to the media in support of the protesters. On 28 July 2019, Yeung was among those arrested outside the IFC Mall in Central for "obstruction of police". After 48 hours of detainment, he was released on bail pending further investigation. Upon his release, Yeung delivered a speech to the media and described his experience. He recalled sitting in a parking lot, along with dozens of detainees, under the scorching summer temperature for an entire day. The protesters, many of whom had been charged with rioting and faced up to 10 years of imprisonment, were mostly under the age of 25 according to Yeung. He believed the escalating police and prosecution tactics would only lead to more protests.

In June 2020, Yeung was scheduled to speak at an event hosted by activist group Sunrise Movement. The event was intended to exchange comparative strategies between the Hong Kong protests and the Black Lives Matter movement. On 17 June, Sunrise Movement cancelled the event with Yeung, citing internal concerns and external criticisms. Sunrise Movement's decision was met with discontent, with critics highlighting the prevalence of "disinformation and smearing campaigns" against Hong Kong's activists. Lausan, a publication focused on Hong Kong affairs, stated the pro-democracy movement was being discredited.

=== Memberships ===
Over the years, Yeung became involved in numerous human rights organisations. He is a board member at Amnesty International, a member of World Movement for Democracy, and part of the Freedom Fellowship program at Human Rights Foundation. He is also the chairperson of the Hong Kong Civil Hub, an organisation dedicated to promoting the rule of law, democracy, and human rights in Hong Kong.
