= Civil Human Rights Front =

Hong Kong human rights organisation

- 民間人權陣線
- CHRF logo
- Abbreviation: CHRF
- Formation: 13 September 2002
- Dissolved: 15 August 2021
- Type: NGO
- Key people: Chung Chung-fai (last convener); Jimmy Sham Tsz-kit; Figo Chan Ho-wun; Icarus Wong Ho-yin; Johnson Yeung; Andrew Shum Wai-nam
- Website: www.civilhrfront.org (Cantonese only)

Civil Human Rights Front
- Traditional Chinese: 民間人權陣線
- Simplified Chinese: 民间人权阵线
Transcriptions
Standard Mandarin
- Hanyu Pinyin: Mínjiān Rénquán Zhènxiàn
- Bopomofo: ㄇㄧㄣˊ ㄐㄧㄢ ㄖㄣˊ ㄑㄩㄢˊ ㄓㄣˋ ㄒㄧㄢˋ
- Wade–Giles: Min^{2}-chien^{1} Jen^{2}-chʻüan^{2} Chen^{4}-hsien^{4}
- Tongyong Pinyin: Mín-jian Rén-cyuán Jhèn-siàn
- IPA: [mǐn.tɕjɛ́n ɻə̌n.tɕʰɥɛ̌n ʈʂə̂n.ɕjɛ̂n]
Yue: Cantonese
- Yale Romanization: Màhn gāan Yàhn kyùhn Jahn sin
- Jyutping: man4 gaan1 jan4 kyun4 zan6 sin3
- IPA: [mɐn˩ kan˥ jɐn˩ kʰyn˩ tsɐn˨ sin˧]

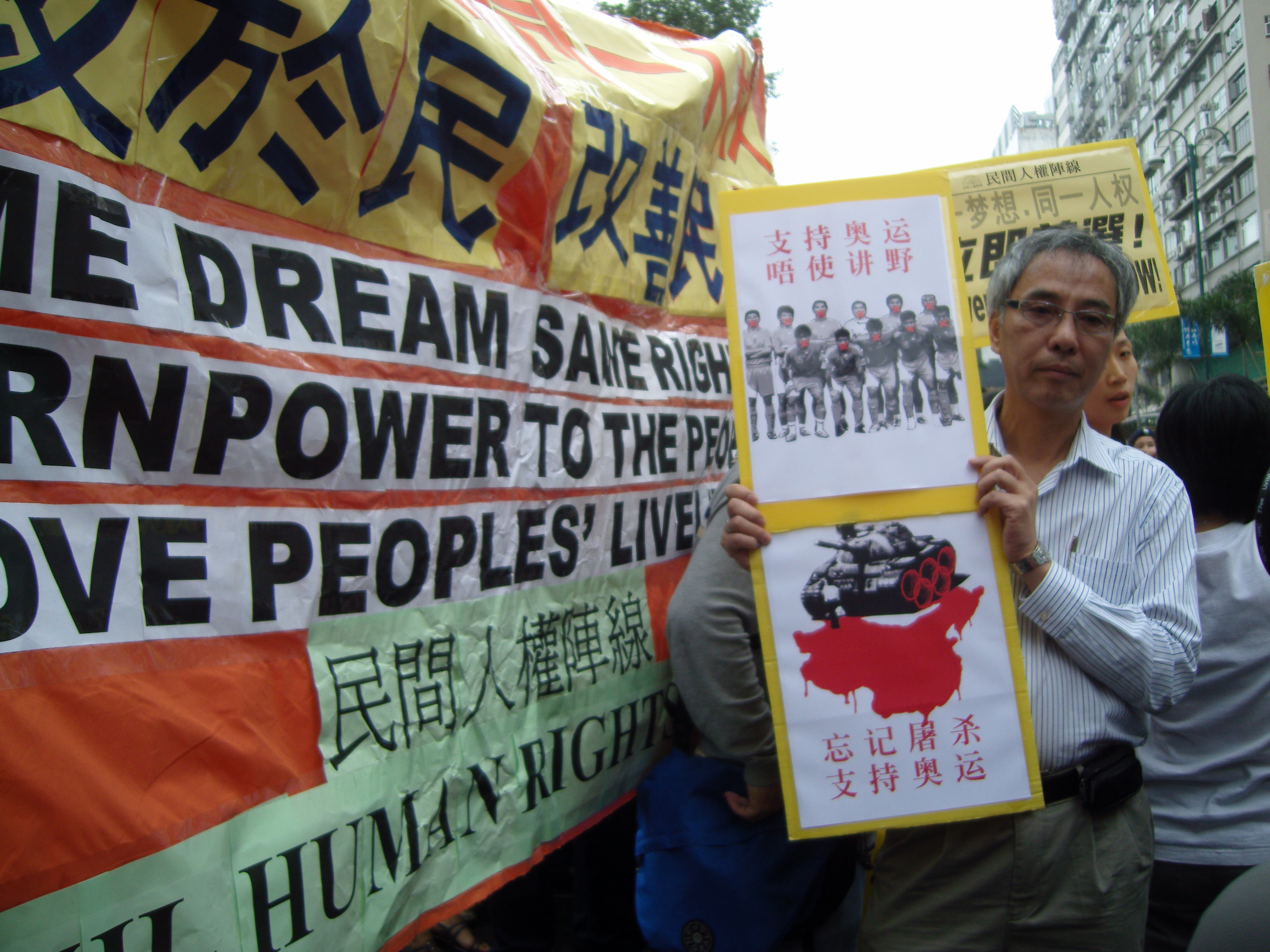
Civil Human Rights Front members protesting in Tsim Sha Tsui on the day of 2008 Summer Olympics torch relay.

The Civil Human Rights Front (CHRF) was an organisation that focused on the issues of Hong Kong politics and livelihood, affiliated with almost all pan-democratic camps in Hong Kong. It was founded on 13 September 2002 and disbanded on 15 August 2021.

Forty-eight NGOs and political groups were involved in the organisation in January 2006. The most well-known event held by the CHRF was the Hong Kong 1 July marches.

== Organisational development ==
Civil Human Rights Front was founded on 13 September 2002, with the aim to provide a platform consolidating voices and powers from various groups and spectrum of the societies in order to advance the development in the human and civil rights movements.

The initial aim was to focus on the enactment of the legislation of Article 23 of the Basic Law. After the July 1 protest in 2003, the organisation started to diversify its mandate, to include issues such as equal opportunities and authorities given to the police.

Since 2017 they have been lobbying the Hong Kong government through the United Nations Universal Periodic Review (UPR) process as one of the main Hong Kong UPR Coalition Steering Committee members alongside Justice Centre Hong Kong, PEN Hong Kong, and Hong Kong Watch.

=== Arrest of Figo Chan ===
In April 2020, then-vice-convener, also known as co-convener of the organisation, Figo Chan, was arrested as part of a crackdown on pro-democracy activists who organised and participated in unlawful assemblies. In May 2020, he appeared before the West Kowloon magistrates' court and was granted bail. There, he said that "demonstrating is not a crime".

=== 2021 coalition exodus, national security law and allegations of foreign funding ===
After the charging of 47 pro-democracy activists and politicians under the national security law (including the indictment of former convener Jimmy Sham Tsz-kit), the organisation was questioned by pro-Beijing media as to whether it had a right to exist under the current security laws. In March 2021, the Democratic Party and the teachers' union withdrew from the Front. Convener Figo Chan confirmed this but did not explain further. Also in the same month, a Singaporean newspaper quoted officials from the Hong Kong government saying that the Front was funded by the US agency National Endowment for Democracy, which is illegal under the national security law as "colluding with foreign forces"; both, former convener Sham and current convener Chan denied the allegations. On the threat of disbandment, Chan said that "[F]or this reason, we will not and cannot disband, and I, as its convenor, am absolutely willing to live and die with the Front as long as there are still member groups that remain."

=== 2021 arrest of Jimmy Sham and conviction of Figo Chan ===
On 6 January 2021, Jimmy Sham was arrested along dozens others amidst a crackdown on pro-democracy figures and participants of the pro-democracy primaries. Sham was rearrested on 28 February 2021 on subversion charges and awaits trial as of late May 2021. Also in late May 2021, the group's convener Figo Chan was convicted over an unlawful assembly in 2019 and handed a 18 months' imprisonment term, leading the group temporarily leaderless.

== Member organisations ==
The following civic organisations and political parties are members of CHRF.

- Student Christian Movement of Hong Kong (香港基督徒學生運動)
- Hong Kong Journalists Association (香港記者協會)
- Hong Kong Council of the Church of Christ in China (中華基督教會深愛堂社關團契)
- Civic Party (公民黨)
- Power for Democracy (民主動力)
- Democratic Party (民主黨)
- Pioneer Group (先驅社)
- Asia Monitor Resource Centre (亞洲專訊資料研究中心)
- League of Social Democrats (社會民主連線)
- Hong Kong Human Rights Monitor (香港人權監察)
- Hong Kong Human Rights Commission (香港人權聯委會)
- The Chinese University of Hong Kong Student Union (香港中文大學學生會)
- Justice and Peace Commission of the H.K. Catholic Diocese (香港天主教正義和平委員會)
- Hong Kong Catholic Commission For Labour Affairs (香港天主教勞工事務委員會)
- Hong Kong Alliance in Support of Patriotic Democratic Movements of China (香港市民支援愛國民主運動聯合會)
- Hong Kong Democratic Development Network (香港民主發展網絡)
- Hong Kong Social Workers' General Union (香港社會工作者總工會)
- Hong Kong Informal Education Research Centre (香港非正規教育研究中心)
- Hong Kong Christian Institute (香港基督徒學會)
- Hong Kong Women Christian Council (香港婦女基督徒協會)
- Hong Kong Professional Teachers' Union (香港教育專業人員協會)
- Unison (香港融樂會)
- Hong Kong Confederation of Trade Unions (香港職工會聯盟)
- Christians for Hong Kong Society (基督徒關懷香港學會)
- Rainbow Action (彩虹行動)
- Sham Shui Po Community Association (深水埗社區協會)
- Zi Teng (紫藤)
- Neighbourhood and Worker's Service Centre (街坊工友服務處)
- New World First Bus Company Staff Union (新世界第一巴士公司職工會)
- Association for the Advancement of Feminism (新婦女協進會)
- Kwai Chung Estate Christian Basic Community (葵涌基督徒基層團體)
- People Planning In Action (人民規劃行動)
- Neo Democrats (新民主同盟)
- Labour Party (工黨)
- Joint Office of Councillors Au Nok-hin & Lo Kin-hei (區諾軒 羅健熙議員聯合辦事處)
- iDemocracy Asia (華人民主書院)
- Cross Border Children Concern Coalition (關注跨境兒童權益聯席)
- League in Defense of Hong Kong's Freedoms (保衛香港自由聯盟)
- Leung Kwok-hung Legislative Council Member's Office (梁國雄立法會議員辦事處)
- April Fifth Action (四五行動)
- Hong Kong Association for Democracy and People's Livelihood (香港民主民生協進會)
- Hong Kong Women Workers' Association (香港婦女勞工協會)
- Hong Kong Branch of the Chinese Democratic United Front (中國民主聯合陣線香港分部)
- Grassroots Cultural Center (草根文化中心)
- Hong Kong Sex Society (香港性學會)
- Hong Kong Women's League (香港女同盟會)
- University of Abode (居港權大學)
- Cen Yonggen Community Service Office (岑永根社區服務處)
