= Figo Chan =

Hong Kong political and human rights activist

- 陳皓桓
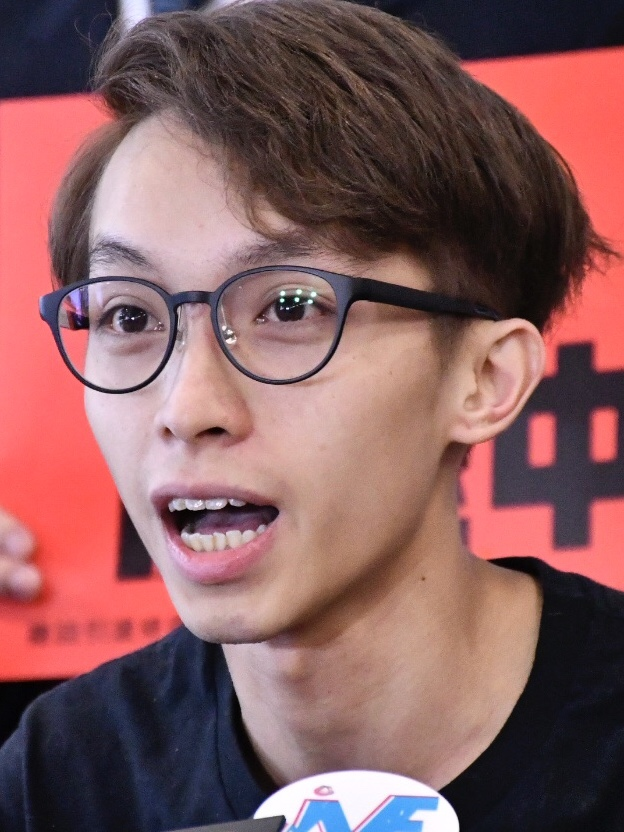
- Figo Chan in 2019

Convener of the Civil Human Rights Front
- In office October 2020 – 28 May 2021
- Preceded by: Jimmy Sham Tsz-kit
- Succeeded by: Chung Chung-fai

Vice-convener of Civil Human Rights Front
- In office October 2018 – October 2020

Personal details
- Born: 3 April 1996 (age 30) British Hong Kong
- Party: League of Social Democrats

Figo Chan
- Traditional Chinese: 陳皓桓
- Simplified Chinese: 陈皓桓
Transcriptions
Standard Mandarin
- Hanyu Pinyin: Chén Hàohuán
Yue: Cantonese
- Jyutping: can4 hou6 wun4

Figo Chan Ho-wun (Chinese: 陳皓桓; born 3 April 1996) is a Hong Kong pro-democracy activist who served as convener of the Civil Human Rights Front from October 2020 until his conviction in May 2021, when he was succeeded by Chung Chung-fai. As vice-convener of the organisation (between 2018 and 2020) Chan and then convener Jimmy Sham Tsz-kit, planned major marches during the 2019–20 Hong Kong protests. In November 2019, Chan and Emily Lau were awarded the John McCain Prize for Leadership in Public Service on behalf of the people of Hong Kong during the Halifax International Security Forum. He also is member of the League of Social Democrats.

On 19 October 2020, along with activists Ted Hui, Kalvin Ho, Joshua Wong and others, he protested in front of the Thai Consulate in Hong Kong in a show of solidarity with the Thai protesters calling for government and monarchy reforms.

== Activism post-2021 arrests of pro-democracy figures ==
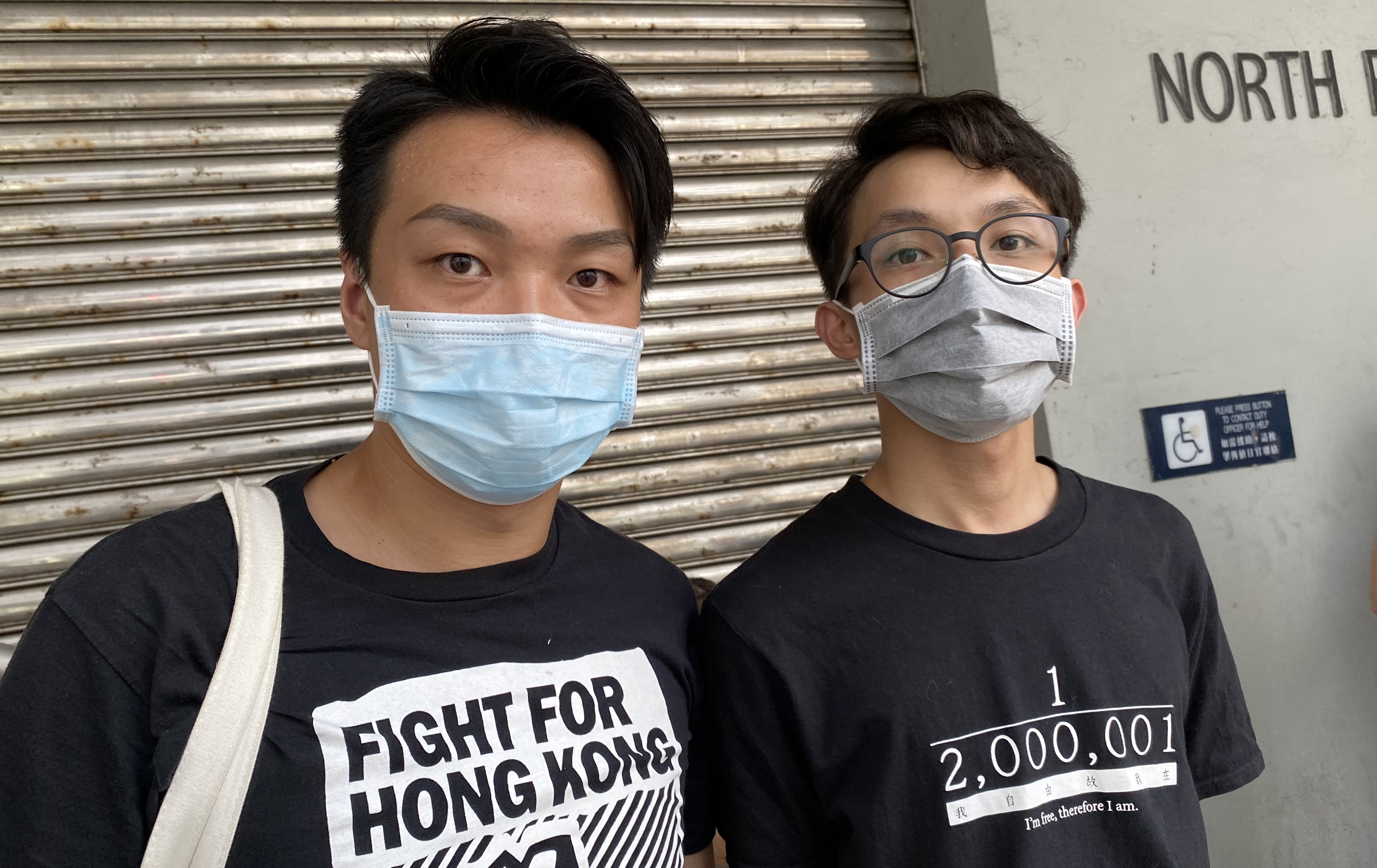
Chan (right) and former CHRF convener Jimmy Sham (left) in 2020

Following the arrest in January and charging in February 2021 of dozens of pro-democracy activists and politicians, Chan continued with his activism as convener of the Civil Human Rights Front. He denied, along with former convener and imprisoned Jimmy Sham, that the CHRF was foreign-funded and said the organisation would continue its activities. In May 2021, previous to the beginning of the "subversion trial", he was accused in court of organising an unlawful assembly in 2019. Chan alleged that there was no wrongdoing and that the violence that erupted following the demonstration had nothing to do with their convening. Chan was put on trial in late May 2021 for that assembly along with activist Avery Ng and tycoon Jimmy Lai. Chan also warned that if the government does not allow peaceful demonstrations to take place, it could trigger protests similar to those in 2019 and include violence.

== Arrests and convictions ==
Chan has been arrested multiple times for the demonstrations. On 18 April 2020 he was arrested with fellow League of Social Democrats (LSD) activist Leung Kwok-hung (also known as Long Hair), amid a crackdown on pro-democracy activists. When he appeared before the court to hear his bail, he said that "demonstrating is not a crime."

He was arrested again on 6 September 2020 for protesting the delay of the 2020 legislative election, which were postponed to 2021 for the COVID-19 pandemic in Hong Kong situation.

On 8 December 2020, Chan was arrested for his alleged involvement in the unauthorized 1 July march that year. Seven other democrats were arrested the same day on similar charges.

On 28 May 2021, Chan was sentenced to 18 months' imprisonment on charges of organising an unauthorised assembly in 2019 which then turned violent.

On 16 October 2021, Chan was sentenced to additional 12 months' imprisonment for a July 2020 unauthorised assembly which aimed at protesting the newly passed national security law.

In July 2022, it was announced that Chan was facing other 14 counts of crimes involving his efforts in organising protests in 2020.

== Imprisonment and identity ==
Chan reacted to his conviction by saying that jail time will make him a "better man" and adding that "It's better for me to be jailed when I am still young [...] I can do sports and train my muscles." About his national identity, Chan recalled his patriotic fervour as a child when the 2008 Summer Olympics took place and his wishes to travel to mainland China and said he "believed I was a proud Chinese person", but added that "nothing can give me that recognition of (Chinese) identity any more."

On October 10, 2022, Chan was released from prison, where he vowed to continue with his activism. Chan regretted the disbandment of the CHRF and when asked about leaving Hong Kong, he said that he is "very, very unwilling to emigrate now".

Political offices
Preceded by Jimmy Sham	Convenor of Civil Human Rights Front; 2020–2021	Succeeded by Chung Chung-fai
