= Alexandra Wong =

Hong Kong social activist (born 1956)

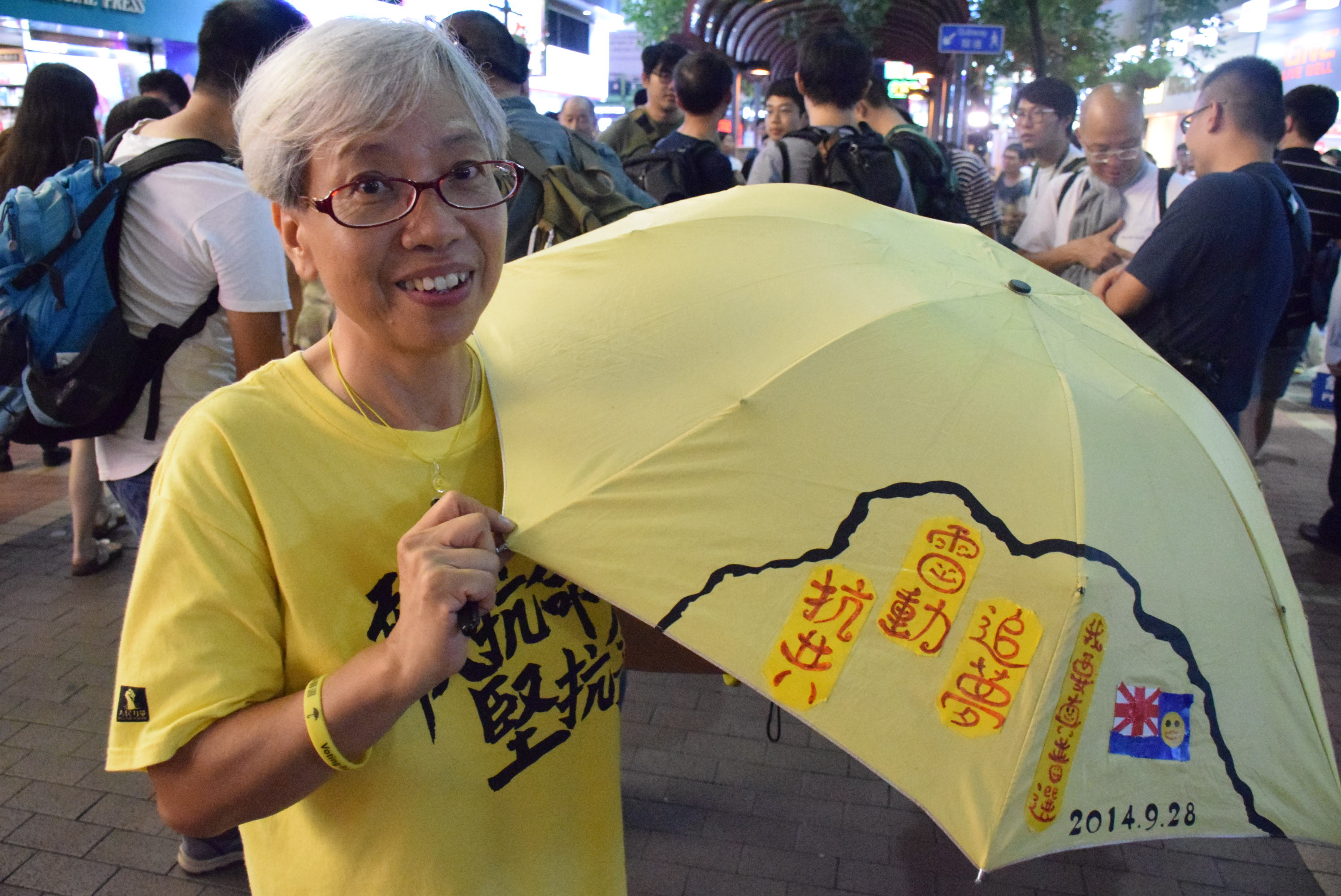
- Alexandra Wong during a protest in 2016
- Born: 16 May 1956 (age 70); British Hong Kong
- Other name: Grandmother Wong
- Known for: Waving a Union Jack flag at the 2019–20 Hong Kong protests

Chinese name
- Traditional Chinese: 王鳳瑤
- Simplified Chinese: 王凤瑶
Transcriptions
Standard Mandarin
- Hanyu Pinyin: Wáng Fèngyáo
Yue: Cantonese
- Jyutping: Wong^{4} Fung^{6}-jiu^{4}

Grandmother Wong
- Chinese: 王婆婆
Transcriptions
Standard Mandarin
- Hanyu Pinyin: Wáng Pópo
Yue: Cantonese
- Jyutping: Wong^{4} po^{4}po^{4*2}

Alexandra Wong Fung-yiu (born 16 May 1956), also known as Grandma Wong, is a Hong Kong social activist of the pro-democracy camp. She came to international attention in 2019 for waving a large British flag at pro-democracy protests. She is also known for having been disappeared in August 2019, to publicly resurface only 14 months later at a press conference in Hong Kong, where she shared her ordeal of being held in mainland China.

== Early life and career ==
Wong was born and raised in Sham Shui Po, British Hong Kong. She finished higher education, majored in accounting and music, then worked as an auditor. At the age of thirty, she moved to Vienna, Austria to study vocal music, then briefly lived in the United States.

After she returned to Hong Kong, she volunteered with World Vision International in Shaanxi in 2004, and bought a flat in Shenzhen two years later, hoping to live there permanently. However, while she was volunteering, she found living in mainland China complicated, which prompted her to start her activism at that point.

== Activism ==
=== Early activism ===
In 2012, she participated in the anti-Moral and National Education protests. After the protests, following her diagnosis with breast cancer, she took time off from activism for surgery and treatment. She was often spotted during the Umbrella Movement in 2014, when although living in Shenzhen, she travelled to Hong Kong several times a week.

In 2018, Wong attended the trial of activist Edward Leung, wearing the slogan "Liberate Hong Kong" (光復香港) printed on her scarf, and yelled "Hong Kong has become Mainland China," (香港而家變咗大陸啦). The judge barred her from the courtroom, but allowed her to watch the trial livestream in the building. On 7 March, she was found guilty of contempt of court and was fined HK$1,000.

=== 2019 protests, disappearance and return ===
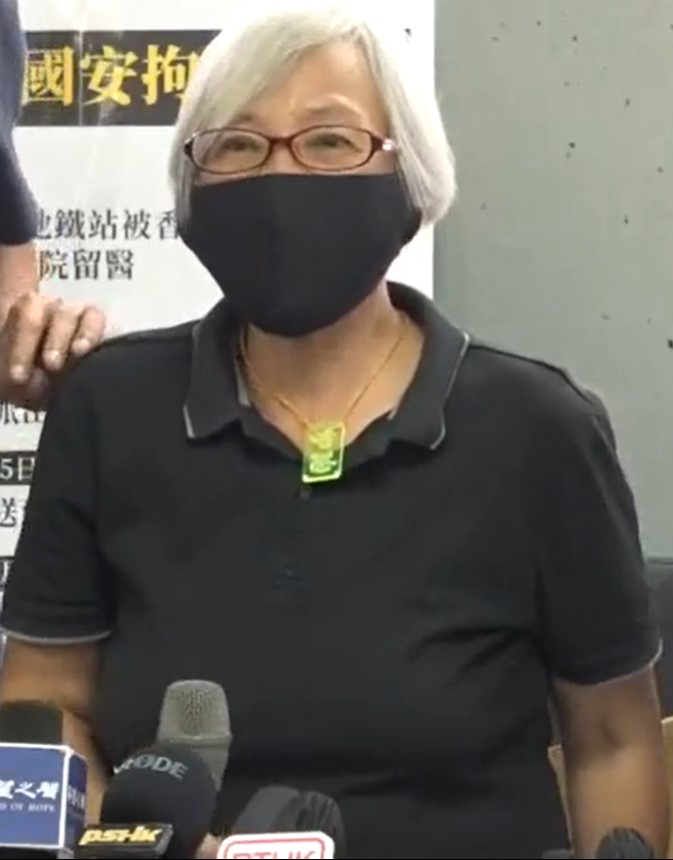
Wong upon returning to Hong Kong, 2020

After the outbreak of protests against the Hong Kong extradition bill, Wong gained attention for attending demonstrations waving her British flag. She disappeared in August 2019 and was reportedly taken away by security forces. Lawmaker Eddie Chu enquired as to her whereabouts and was told by the Security Bureau that she was "safe". Upon her return to Hong Kong in October 2020, she reported that she had been sent to Shaanxi in September 2019, where she was subject to political indoctrination and was forced to sing the Chinese national anthem while holding the Chinese flag, while repeatedly being asked "Why do you fly your British flag? You are Chinese." She also said that she was never given formal notification of the charges against her and alleged that she had suffered "mental abuse."

On 2 October 2020, Wong announced that she had returned to Hong Kong following criminal proceedings in the mainland and that she was being treated at the Tuen Mun Hospital after a scuffle with security officers. Wong also stated that she had been detained in Futian for "picking quarrels and provoking trouble" and that she was later transferred to a prison in Shenzhen before being sent to Shaanxi. She held a press conference along with Chu and Fernando Cheung, another lawmaker, where she recalled her experiences in the 14 months in the mainland.

In an interview with CNN in November 2020, Wong urged young Hong Kongers to leave and start a life elsewhere, while saying that it is too late for an "old woman" like her to do the same. She added that she would continue her activism because it would be "impossible" for her to be quiet and declared that she was not afraid of going to jail again.

In March 2021, Wong was interviewed by France24 due to her presence outside the court as the national security law regarding the charge of subversion continued against 47 activists arrested in January and charged in February 2021. Wong urged Hong Kong people to "come out again and tell the world that we will continue to fight for freedom, democracy and justice."

On 28 November 2022, Wong took part in a demonstration in Central, in solidarity with protesters in mainland China against the zero-COVID policy. She was then assaulted by a 22-year-old man, who was later arrested, while Wong herself was taken to Queen Mary Hospital for treatment.

=== Political position regarding Hong Kong ===
I miss colonial times. The British colonial time was so good for us. I saw the future ... I don't have any worries about anyone. I just care about the future of Hong Kong youth.

— Alexandra Wong, July 2019

In a July 2019 interview with Reuters, Wong said she missed colonial times and that she had bought her large British flag and pins in Shenzhen but that she had to secretly ask for a British flag because "they only showed the Chinese flag." Wong also said that she has no children and that all she worries about is the "future of Hong Kong youth." She also said that she could not live in Hong Kong and commuted everyday from Shenzhen because living in Hong Kong made her feel sad.

=== Arrests and convictions ===
Wong was arrested and charged with assault after she rushed at the guard who had approached her for a security check at the High Court in January 2019. In late November 2020, she was nominated for the Nobel Peace Prize by the UK's All-Party Parliamentary Group on Hong Kong after her arrest. On 14 July 2021, she was convicted and sentenced to one month in jail for the assault.

On 30 May 2021, Wong was arrested while marching alone on the eve of the 32nd anniversary of the Tiananmen massacre, and released the following day.

In April 2022, Wong was sentenced to six days in jail with a 18-month suspension for obstructing a police officer. On 13 July 2022, she was jailed for eight months for unlawful assembly in relation to two unauthorized protests she took part in on 11 August 2019.

In June 2023, Wong and various other pro-democracy activists were arrested including Chan Po-ying, Mak Yin-ting, and Leo Tang. All of the people arrested were leaders in various pro-democracy movements including the Hong Kong Journalists Association, Confederation of Trade Unions, and League of Social Democrats. The arrests were conducted on the 34th anniversary of the Tiananmen Square protests.

On the evening of 4 June 2024, the 35th anniversary of the Tiananmen Square protests, a woman was apprehended by police for chanting slogans suspected to be "seditious" under the National Security Ordinance. The woman was released on bail the following day without charge. Local media reported that the woman in question was Wong.
