= Jackie Chen =

Hong Kong social worker

- 陳虹秀
- Born: Chen Hung-sau; 1976 or 1977 (age 48–49); Hong Kong
- Education: Chinese University of Hong Kong (BEng); The University of Hong Kong (MSW); Hong Kong Polytechnic University (MAP)
- Occupation: Social worker

Jackie Chen Hung-sau (Chinese: 陳虹秀) is a Hong Kong social worker and activist. She was convicted of rioting by the Hong Kong government on 11 March 2025 for trying to mitigate tensions by urging police to exercise restraint during the 2019–2020 Hong Kong protests. She is remanded for sentencing on 9 April 2025.

== Early life and education ==
Chan was born into a middle-class family and has a younger brother. Her father was a civil servant, while her mother worked as a health worker. She attended a band-one high school and later enrolled at the Chinese University of Hong Kong to study information technology. During her university years, she became involved in volunteer services, which sparked her interest in becoming a social worker. After graduating with a Bachelor of Engineering, she entered the University of Hong Kong to study social work, earning a Master of Social Work in 2003. She went on to become an assistant principal at a children's home, focusing on children with special educational needs. In 2017, after her father died of cardiac arrest, she recognized a need for health services in Hong Kong and shifted her focus to serve in that field. She earned a Master of Applied Psychology from the Hong Kong Polytechnic University during her time in pending appeal review.

== Career ==
=== Social activism ===
She was convicted of rioting by the Hong Kong government on 11 March 2025, for trying to mitigate tensions by urging police to exercise restraint in a protest in 2019. Chen had initially been cleared of the rioting charge in 2020 by district court judge Sham Siu-man, on the grounds that the prosecutors had failed to provide enough evidence to make out any case against her, and that her conduct and speech did not amount to taking part in an unlawful assembly, let alone a riot. But the Hong Kong government appealed against her acquittal and the Court of Appeal ordered a retrial. Her retrial took place in December 2024 and this time another judge ruled that she had a case to answer. The court also heard that Chen had used a loudspeaker to urge police to act with constraint, to give people time to retreat, and not to deploy tear gas against reporters and residents without protective gear. In his submissions, Chen's defense lawyer kept asking the prosecutor, "What was the crime in a social worker urging police to act with restraint?" Chen's case signaled the tough stance the Hong Kong authorities have taken toward politically sensitive cases. Her verdict and subsequent sentencing will become a major legal precedent for any similar cases to come. Since 2019, more than 800 have been charged with rioting, a crime broadly interpreted by local courts to cover many of those who were merely present or passing by the scenes of violence without intentions proved beyond doubt.

According to The Witness, out of the 2019 protests cases that were charged with rioting, at least 12 defendants (including Jackie Chen) were social workers or social work students. Some were convicted without any proof of intent but by inference from circumstantial evidences, such as their clothing colour or the protective gears they were wearing or carrying at the time of the arrest.

She is one of the interviewees of Kiwi Chow's 2020 documentary film Revolution of Our Times.

=== Community services ===
Chen was part of the "Battlefield Social Workers" volunteer group, members of which carried a loudspeaker to mediate between police and protesters during Hong Kong's 2019 protests. They monitored police action in case if any excessive or unnecessary force was used on civilians, and offered emotional relief to people as well as support services to those arrested. She was also an alternative member on the Disciplinary Committee (2022–2024) of Hong Kong's Social Workers Registration Board, and served as a council member when on the board (2016–2022) of the Hong Kong Federation of Social Workers.

In early May 2020, Chen was nominated and won the Outstanding Social Worker Award, presented by the Hong Kong Social Workers Association. Chen has taken at least six volunteer trips to China, Taiwan and other parts of Asia providing post-disaster psychological support services.
