= Timeline of reactions to the 2020 Hong Kong national security law (June 2021) =

Timeline of the 2019–2020 Hong Kong protests
2019			March–June				July	August	September	October	November	December
2020	January	February	March	April	May	June	July	August	September	October	November	December
2021	January	February	March	April	May	June	July	August	September–November			December

Few protests took place in June 2021 and there were no large-scale demonstrations in threat of the national security law. The anniversary of the 1989 Tiananmen Square protests and massacre on 4 June saw only small crowds or single individuals engaging in vigils in the vicinity of Victoria Park – the venue of large vigils on the same occasion in past years – before police dispersed them. The pro-democracy tabloid Apple Daily once again had its headquarters raided by police using the national security law; its executives were arrested. Security Bureau also froze the assets of three Apple Daily companies, which led the newspaper to print its final edition on 24 June. Many pan-democratic groups disbanded at the end of the month under pressure from the law.

== 1 June ==
=== Activist bail denied ===
On 1 June 2021, the bail application for Ben Chung, Gordon Ng, Henry Wong, Andrew Chiu, Nathan Lau, Gary Fan and Winnie Yu, were all denied. Raymond Chan and Carol Ng had withdrawn their bail applications earlier.

== 2 June ==
=== Good Neighbors North District Church dissolved ===
In the early morning, Good Neighbors North District Church announced on Facebook that the group had ceased operations after 31 May, and the two meeting points in Fanling and Kwun Tong were also closed at the same time. The statement mentioned "Thank you all for walking along the way."

== 3 June ==
=== Former CUHK Student Union president sentenced to jail ===
The former president of the Chinese University of Hong Kong Student Union, Owen Au, and four other men aged 20 to 48 were convicted of all 13 counts of unlawful assembly and possession of offensive weapons. The defense requested that "no one is a winner in the social movement, some people are in prison, some people immigrate, we are all victims in the incident", and pointed out that when the court imposes a sentence, it should send a message of tolerance and forgiveness. However, the magistrate of the Kowloon City Magistrates' Court, Jacky Ip, believed that the risk of violent incidents caused by illegal assembly was very high, and the defendants used objects to hide their identities. In the end, Au was sentenced to half a year in jail, and the remaining defendants were jailed for half a year to 8 months.

=== 2021 Hong Kong Charter website taken down ===
Nathan Law, an activist who is currently in exile in the UK, revealed that the 2021 Hong Kong Charter website established by him and other Hong Kong residents in exile could not be accessed a few days ago. They only learned about it after negotiating with the Israeli company Wix that provided the website design. Hong Kong police once issued a letter accusing the website of violating the national security law, for inciting secession, subversion and inciting subversive intentions, and requiring the supplier to be removed within 72 hours. Law later stated that within 3 hours of his announcement of the incident, Wix had issued a public statement on Twitter, saying that the website had been shut down by mistake and its operation had been restored, and he apologized for the incident.

== 4 June ==
=== Tiananmen Square vigil suppressed, small crowds dispersed around Victoria Park ===
On the 32nd anniversary of the 1989 Tiananmen Square protests and massacre, the Hong Kong Alliance in Support of Patriotic Democratic Movements of China had called off its annual vigils after it had failed to obtain permission from police, ostensibly due to the COVID-19 pandemic – the same reason as in 2020, when thousands turned up for the vigil anyway when the national security law had not yet been in force – and warnings from the Security Bureau. To replace the vigil, the Alliance had encouraged people to light candles independently in public places at 8 p.m. Police sealed off Victoria Park, which had been the venue of the vigils in past years, in the afternoon and put up signs warning against a "prohibited public meeting". They dispersed the small crowd on the periphery of the park, which they by far outnumbered, just after 8 p.m.

== 6 June ==
=== Non-permanent overseas judge of Court of Final Appeal steps down ===
British newspaper The Times reported that the British non-permanent overseas judge of the Hong Kong Court of Final Appeal, Baroness Hale of Richmond, spoke at an online conference and reported that her term of office will expire on 29 July. "I don't want to be reappointed." She also said that the main reason for her departure was that under the current circumstances, she had various doubts about the national security law and could not predict when she could go to Hong Kong. The judiciary stated that Hale would not re-elect as a non-permanent judge of the final court for personal reasons.

== 7 June ==
=== Henry Tong allowed the 'joint enterprise' doctrine appeal to Court of Final Appeal ===
During the riot in Sheung Wan on 28 July 2019, Henry Tong, Elaine To, and a 16-year-old girl Natalie Lee were charged with rioting and were found not guilty after trial. Department of Justice requested the Court of Appeal to clarify whether the 'joint enterprise' doctrine can be applied to cases of unlawful assembly and riot crime. Tong applied for an appeal to the Court of Final Appeal on the ruling. Court of Appeal considered that the prosecution had a profound impact on illegal assembly and riot crimes, and it was of major and widespread importance, so it granted permission to appeal.

=== University of Hong Kong reported two postgraduate faculty members suspected of violating the National Security Law ===
American magazine The Atlantic quoted a professor at the University of Hong Kong who did not want to be named as saying that a group of professors on campus held a closed-door meeting in May on how the national security law would affect the freedom of university research in the future. During the meeting, it was talked about whether the school will provide legal support to professors accused of violating the law, the consequences of students being reported, and whether the school will force professors to teach students about national security education. The professor pointed out that when the meeting came to an end, the professors expressed despair and fear, and pointed out that "'sadness' or 'disappointment' is not enough to describe." The report also revealed that a graduate student of the University of Hong Kong reported that two professors were suspected of violating the national security law.

== 8 June ==
=== Clerk and student charged for sedition ===
A 17-year-old male student and a 45-year-old female clerk were arrested by the National Security Department of the Hong Kong Police and charged with one count of 'conspiracy to publish, publish, distribute, display or copy seditious publications.' This is the first time a minor has been prosecuted. The case was brought to the West Kowloon Magistrates' Court. The prosecution alleged that the two conspired to print and distribute leaflets of Hong Kong independence between May and December 2020. The content included advocating for Hong Kong's independence and acts endangering national security, but did not disclose for promoting the content of the Hong Kong independence. National security law-designated judge Victor So does not believe that they will no longer commit acts endangering national security and opposes the application for bail; and postponed the case until 4 August, pending further investigation by the police.

=== Bus driver found guilty for careless driving ===
A bus driver of NWFB Route 970, Cheung Ho-yin, was stopped by a riot police officer on Nathan Road in Yau Ma Tei on 6 September 2020. He was accused of ringing for no reason and approaching a cleaning woman. He also pointed out that he did not use his hands on Pok Fu Lam Road on the same day. Cheung holds the wheel firmly and charged with dangerous driving and careless driving. Principal Magistrate Ada Yim accused the defendant of failing to focus on the road conditions and adjusting the speed and distance of the vehicle without reasonable circumstances, and was convicted of careless driving. At the same time, she pointed out that there were many passengers in the defendant's car, and pointed out that the penalty could not be dealt with, and the license would be considered to be suspended. In addition, the defendant committed accidentally driving three times in a row, so a fine will not be considered. The magistrate believed that the social service order report indicated that the Cheung was remorseful and sentenced to perform a 100-hour social service order. Lam Kam-piu, president of the New World First Bus Staff Union, believes that the sentence is too heavy. He questioned the fact that the police knew that there was a large-scale demonstration but did not close the road. He believed that mishandling by the police caused misunderstanding. He also said that many bus drivers will inevitably drive or organize things with one hand. He is worried that after the verdict of this case, many drivers may fall into the net of justice every day.

=== Two person fined for violating the gathering restriction order ===
Two 25-year-old men were accused of chanting slogans and gathering with more than 100 people in Mong Kok during the 'Sing with You' activity launched on Mother's Day on 10 May 2020, and were charged for violating the 8-person gathering restriction order. Magistrate Andy Cheng believes that when the police officer issued a warning, coupled with the fact that he had been on guard for a period of time, he described that "anyone who has nothing to do with the incident will stay away from the gathering." When the police chased 15 people, they believed that there would be no passers-by running away with them under normal circumstances. Therefore, they were certain that they belonged to one of the gathering groups of 100 people earlier and had already violated the gathering restriction order. The magistrate also believed that there was no need to record everything in the police log, and agreed that the evidence was not fictitious and found the two defendants guilty. Finally, considering that the large number of people gathered at that time would pose a very large risk of spreading the epidemic, the two were fined HK$12,000 each, which is six times the amount of the plea.

=== Lam Cheuk-ting's riot court case adjourned to 2023 ===
Former Legislative Council member Lam Cheuk-ting and seven others, were charged with participating in the riot in the Yuen Long station attack. The case was brought before the District Court again. Except for the third and fourth defendants, who failed to respond, the five defendants including Lam pleaded not guilty. The case is scheduled for trial on 27 March 2023, and the trial is expected to be 25 days. The prosecution revealed that it would summon 3 public witnesses and 12 police officers, and relied on the defendant's video interviews, CCTV footage and online footage for 168 minutes. However, in the earlier 721 attack, the prosecution decided not to call any police officers to give evidence in court.

=== Canada adds two more permanent residence channels for Hong Kong residents ===
Canadian Minister of Immigration, Refugees and Citizenship, Marco Mendicino, announced that it will provide two groups of Hong Kong residents in Canada with a way to apply for permanent residency, targeting Hong Kong residents who have worked in Canada for at least one year or have recently graduated from college. The policy will take effect on 1 June and will end on 31 August 2026, but the press release emphasizes that the plan may be cancelled at any time.

== 10 June ==
=== Students organized a bazaar scene questioned by FEHD ===
The new student organization Local Youth Will will hold an exhibition at Parallel Space, Tai Nan Street, Sham Shui Po from 9 June, exhibiting a number of photos, recordings and reports related to the anti-extradition bill protests. A charity sale will also be held at the same venue. Sports related items. However, the Food and Environmental Hygiene Department stated that it has received a complaint recently that the unit suspects that it is operating an unlicensed public entertainment venue. The personnel suddenly arrived at the scene to take photos of all the objects on the scene and conduct questioning.

== 11 June ==
=== U.S. Consul-General criticized National Security Law ===
News agency Reuters wrote that U.S. Consul-General in Hong Kong and Macau Hanscom Smith had within the past week made unusually strident remarks about the national security law. Smith had called it "appalling" that routine diplomatic activities, such as meeting local activists, had been "vilified", referring to the crime of collusion with foreign forces from Article 29 of the law. Smith also said that for citizens to not know the "red lines" was not only impinging on their fundamental freedoms, but also "bad for business". In response, government adviser and former security chief Regina Ip told Reuters it was only "China haters" who had reason to worry about falling afoul of the law; "criminal intent" was required for persecution, "not just casual chat". Also, she contradicted Smith on the business outlook of the city, saying that "a lot of businessmen" she spoke to "were very bullish about the economic situation".

=== Government gazetted the amended Film Censorship Ordinance, protest movie screenings canceled ===
In response to the implementation of the national security law, the government gazetted the amendments to the guidelines of Film Censorship Ordinance, which took effect the same day. The guidelines list if a film is shown that is likely to constitute a crime that endangers national security, or may damage Hong Kong's national security in different ways, including depiction, characterization or performance, as well as recognition, support, promotion, beautification, encouragement or content that incites these acts or activities will be regarded by the censors as unsuitable for release. Tin Kai-man, spokesperson for the Hong Kong Film Workers Association, accepted an interview with reporters in his personal capacity. On the same day, Fresh Wave International Short Film Festival announced the cancellation of the screening of the local competition short movie Far from Home about the anti-extradition bill protests.

=== Two members of Student Politicism arrested for propaganda assembly and armed resistance ===
Student organization Student Politicism stated that its convener Wong Yat-chin and spokesperson Alice Wong were arrested. In the evening, the police alleged that someone had called on the public to gather in Causeway Bay or Mong Kok on June 12 on different social platforms in early June. They were suspected of guilty of 'inciting others to participate in an unlawful assembly' and 'promoting or publishing an unauthorized assembly'. Technology Crime Division, Superintendent Wilson Tam, said that he would not rule out more arrests. However, the posts displayed at the police press conference are part of the old posts posted in February and May. A reporter asked which sentence in the post published on 10 June involved illegality and its relevance to the old post. Tam said that this incident was not a conclusive post one by one, saying that the post promoted the use of force and petrol bombs. "It promotes the use of violence. It is a series of incidents in a time."

== 12 June ==
=== Agnes Chow released from prison ===
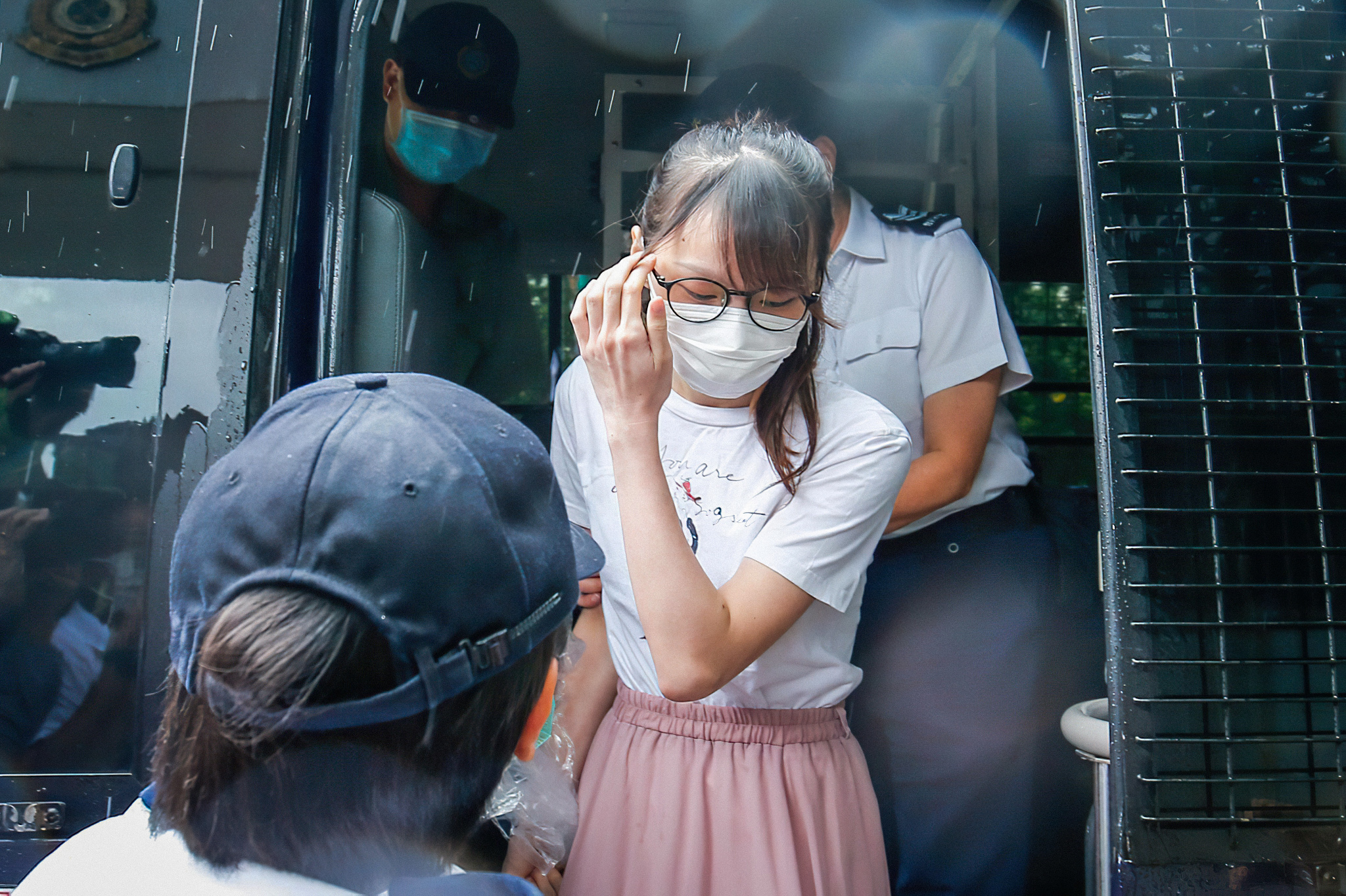
Agnes Chow leaving the prison van after released from prison

Agnes Chow, a former member of Demosistō, was charged with unlawful assembly on 12 June 2019, and was sentenced to 10 months in prison. She was released after deducting one-third of her sentence. Dozens of supporters and over a hundred reporters braved the rain to greet them outside the Tai Lam Centre for Women. At 10 am, Chow was discharged from the prison by a prison van, and then boarded a white private car to leave. She did not respond to reporters' questions. She was slightly thin and was cleared by the police during the period. Supporters greeted at the scene shouted "Agnes Chow, add oil!" and urged her to take a good rest. She later posted on Instagram that "the painful half a year and 20 days is finally over", saying that she must rest and take care of her body.

=== 12 June protests second anniversary ===
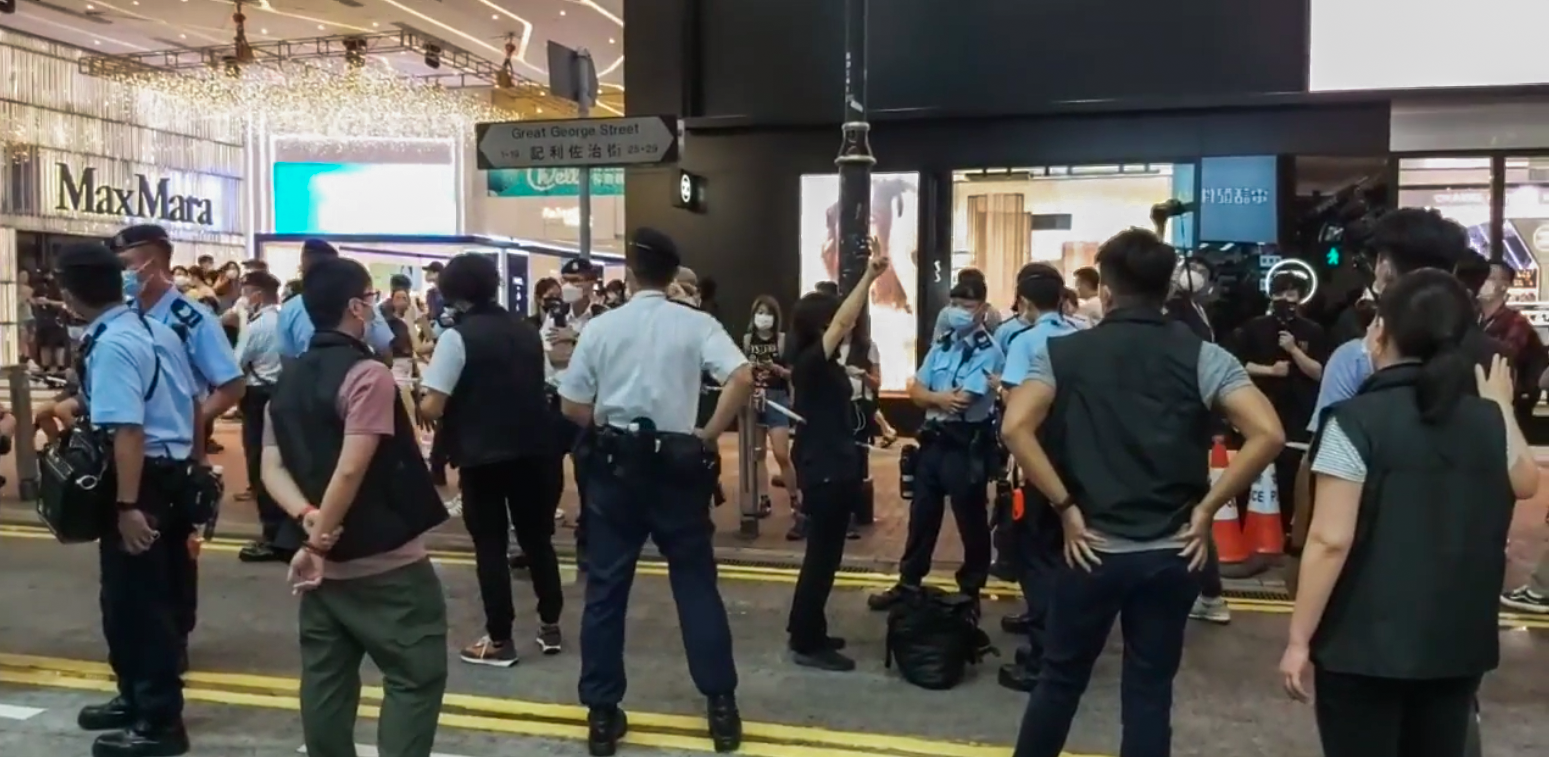
At Great George Street, Causeway Bay, a citizen wearing a black shirt and black trousers raised the Five Demands hand gesture while being intercepted by the police

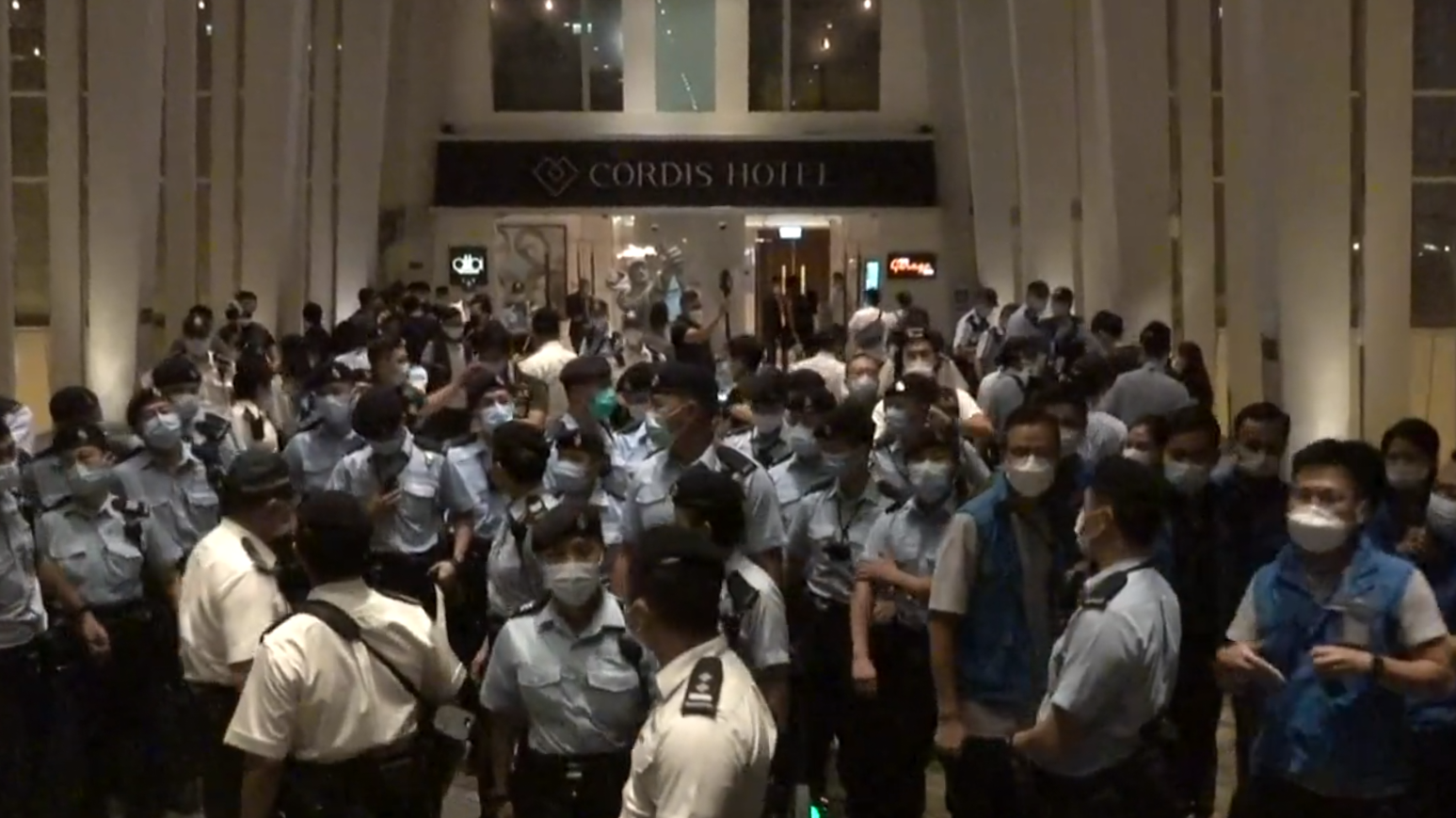
At 9:40 pm, the police claimed that someone was clamoring at Langham Place Mall in Mong Kok. More than 100 police officers rushed into the 4th floor of the mall and surrounded the passage to the Cordis Hong Kong, intercepted passers-by in the passage and arrested a teenager

On the second anniversary of the 12 June protests, the police have been tightly guarded at shopping malls and MTR stations in various districts in Hong Kong. A large number of police officers will be stationed in Causeway Bay and Mong Kok since the afternoon. In Causeway Bay, the police fenced off the road in the pedestrian zone on East Point Road and the junction of Great George Street and Paterson Street to prohibit citizens from entering. Police officers also frequently intercept and search citizens wearing black shirts and black trousers. A citizen wearing a black jacket with the yellow word "I am Hongkonger Hongkonger" and being intercepted said that the streets in Hong Kong are now being considered illegal and are being searched by the police. "How far is the freedom of Hongkongers?" At the street booth set up at the footbridge in Mong Kok, Confederation of Trade Union and the Hospital Authority Employees Alliance were surrounded by 20 police officers for video recording, and issued a ticket to restrict gatherings. The Deputy Chairman of the Staff Front of the Hospital Authority, Ivan Law criticized the police for lack of standards in law enforcement. At night, the street booth set up by the Federation of Students and the Lingnan University Student Union at the same location was also intercepted by the police for investigation.

At 4 pm, the police set up roadblocks at three cross-harbour tunnels to stop all vehicles heading towards Hong Kong Island. Police officers even boarded buses from time to time to intercept passengers, causing traffic jams.

The police said on Facebook earlier that at 4 pm on Dundas Street, Mong Kok, near Fa Yuen Street, several people in black used trash cans and debris to block the road. By about 7 pm, Argyle Street, Nelson Street, and Mong Kok were blocked. Someone pushed down debris on the pavement near Fa Yuen Street. By 9:40pm, the police claimed that someone was clamoring at Langham Place Mall in Mong Kok. More than 100 police officers rushed into the 4th floor of the mall and surrounded the passage to the Cordis Hong Kong hotel, intercepted passers-by in the passage and arrested one juvenile, suspected of disorderly conduct in public places. A large number of police officers drove the tourists away from the mall and they were not allowed to stay. After the police officers left the mall at 10 pm, they suddenly intercepted a number of passing citizens on Portland Street. Two women were charged with violating the restricted gathering order. In addition, at the junction of Shantung Street and Sai Yee Street in Mong Kok, some people used pallets and garbage to block the road. The plainclothes police in ambush immediately arrested two men aged 14 and 19. As of 2 am, the police had arrested 3 people, the youngest being 14 years old, suspected of misbehaving in public places, and voted against 29 people for violating the restricted gathering order.

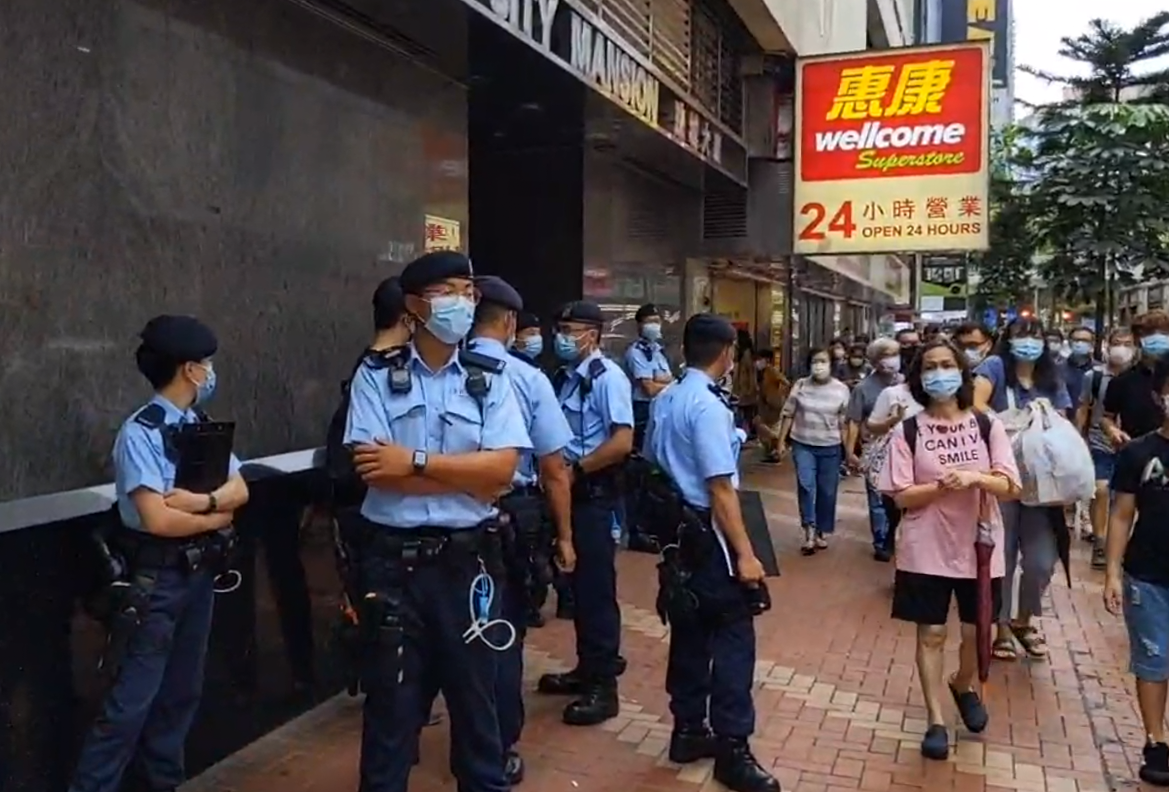
A large number of Tactical Unit police officers are on guard at Great George Street

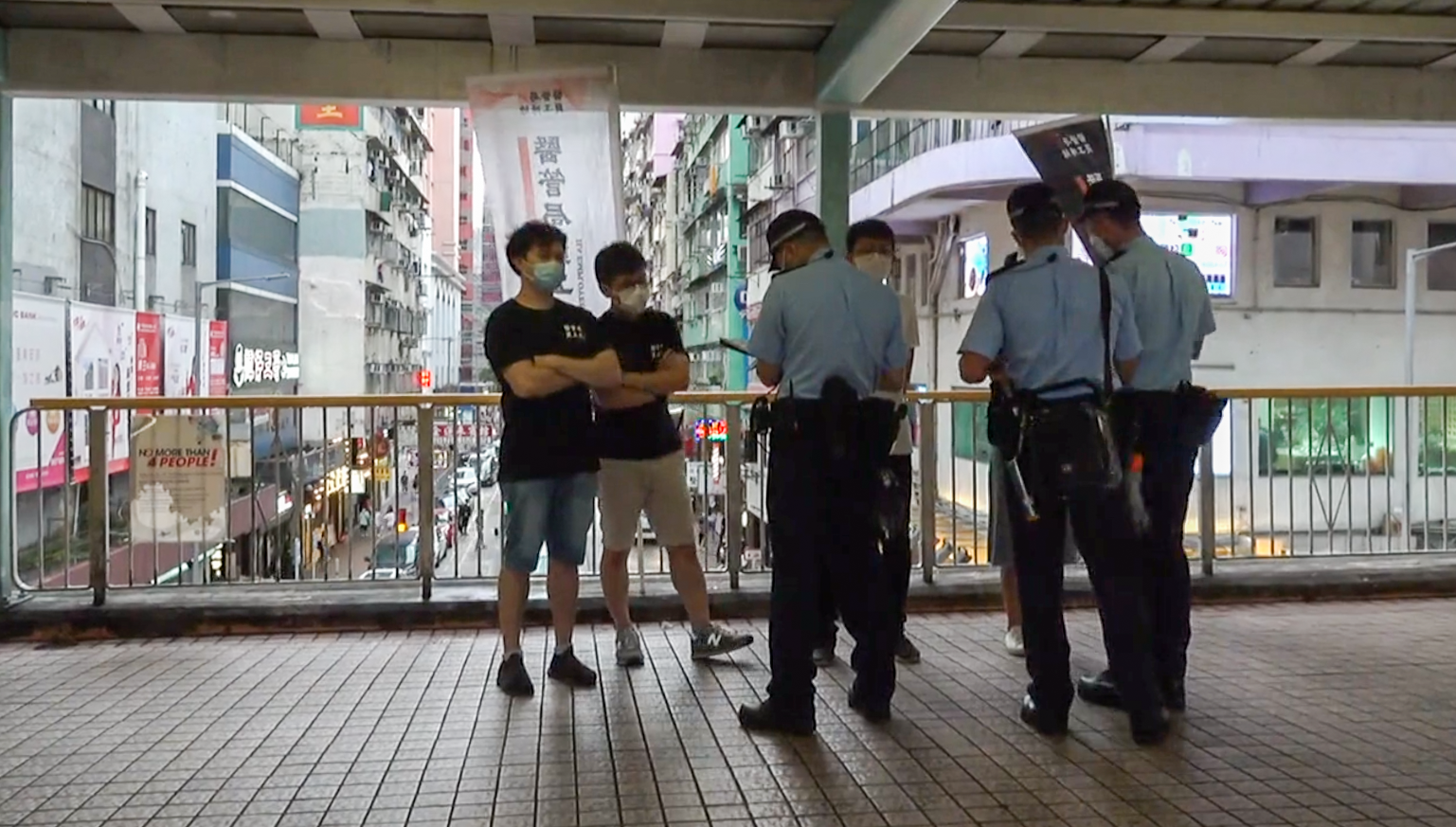
In Mong Kok, CTU in conjunction with HA Employees Alliance at the street booth set up on the footbridge in Mong Kok were issued by police officers to restrict gatherings

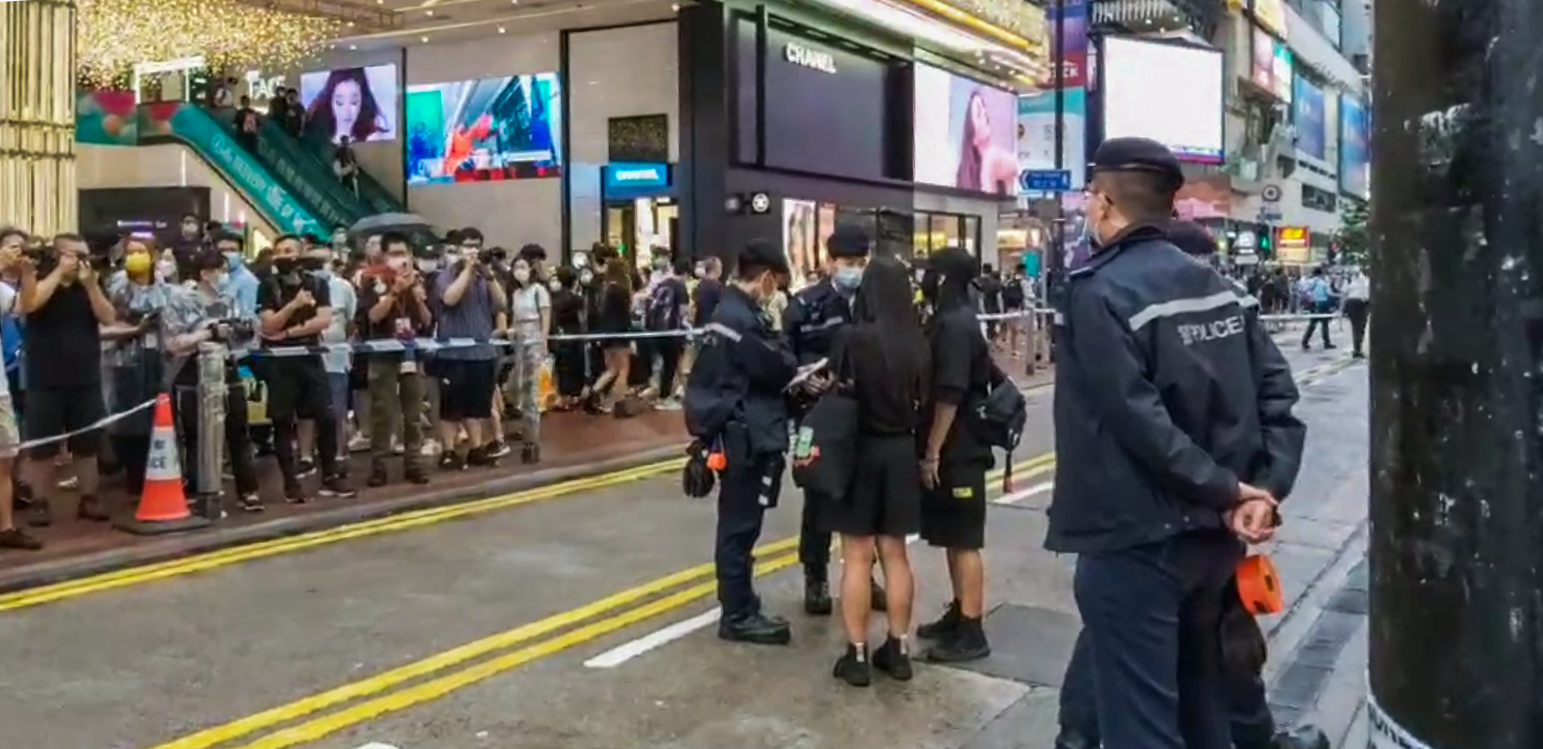
Police cordoned off the road in the pedestrian zone on Great George Street, banned citizens from entering, and brought people who were intercepted to the blockade public range

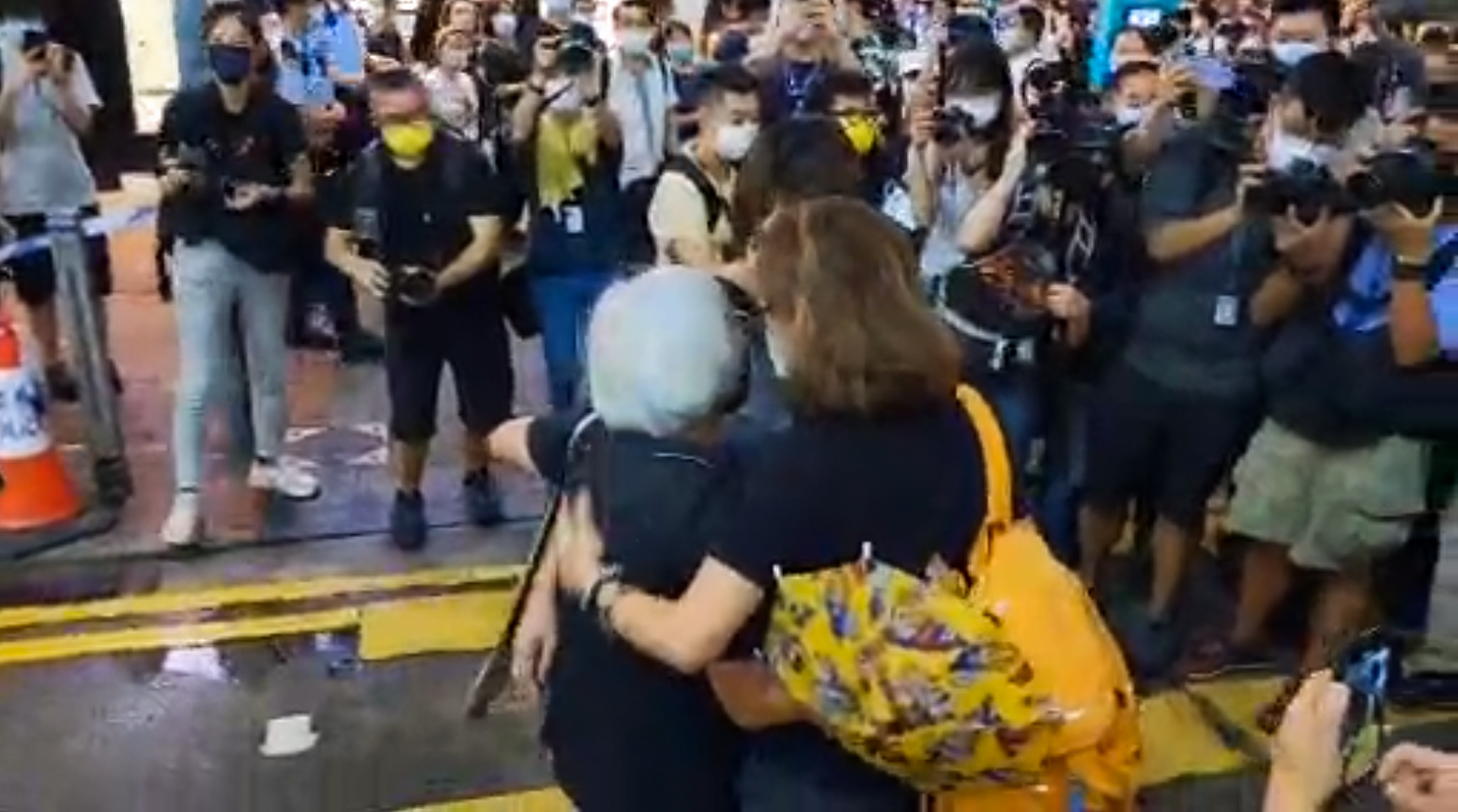
Citizens who have been intercepted hugs Grandma Wong

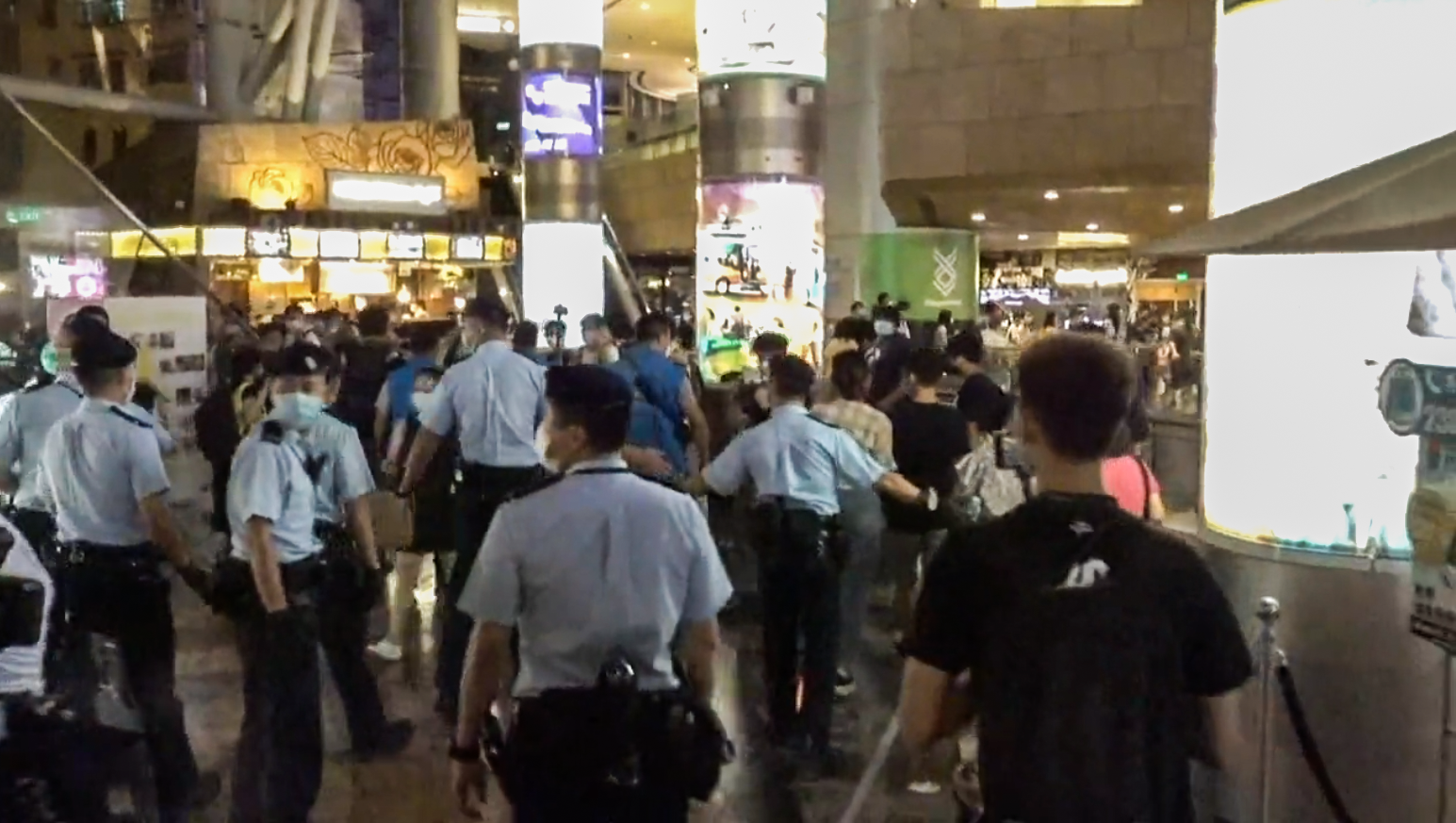
Police disperse visitors to shopping malls in the Langham Place to leave

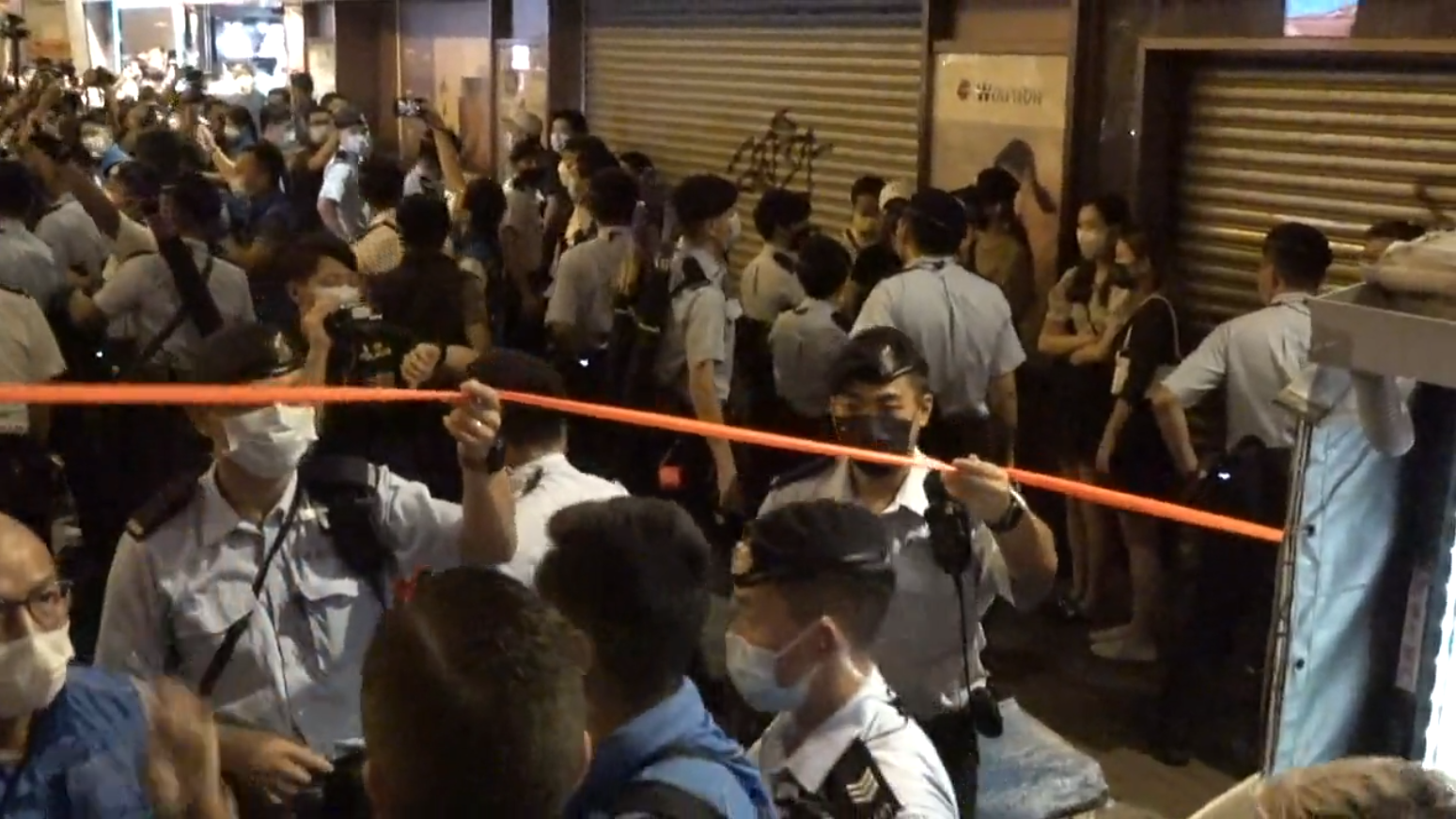
After the police officer left the mall at 10 pm, they suddenly ran to the pavement opposite Portland Street to intercept many passing citizens

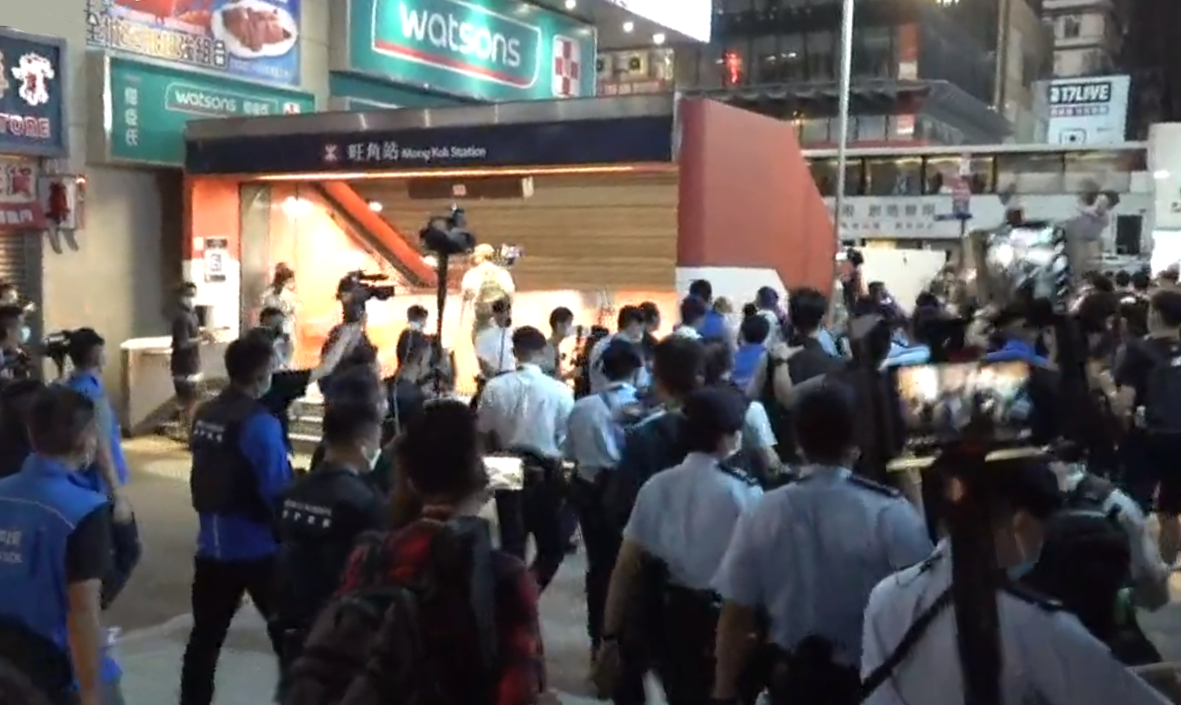
At 11 pm, a large number of police officers formed a line of defense and advanced towards Nathan Road

=== Global rallies of supporting and solidarity with Hong Kong ===
Hong Kong was unable to hold rallies due to the "Gathering Restriction Order", and many overseas Hong Kong people living in countries including the United Kingdom, Canada, New Zealand, the United States, Germany, Australia, Japan and South Korea have organized parades and rallies, and their solidarity was silenced. Of Hong Kong. The coordinating unit named the event "Reunion Like Water", claiming that 52 cities from 22 countries participated in the event.

There are 10 cities in the UK. Among them, 3,000 people attended the rally and parade in London. Participants chanted slogans such as "Liberate", "Hongkongers, add oil", "Hongkongers, revenge", "Fight for freedom, Stand with Hong Kong" and other slogans along the road.

In downtown Vancouver, nearly 800 people responded to the online call and stopped at the open-air plaza outside the Vancouver Art Gallery for half an hour at 12:30 noon. Participants held a yellow card that read "Hong Kong people are arrested", reasons include "having a water bottle", "publish a book the govt doesn't like", "running in a primary election", "gather flowers at a vigil", etc. New Hong Kong Cultural Association held a parade for the second anniversary of the 612 Struggle in Toronto and Calgary to support the people of Hong Kong. Participants in the Toronto convoy parade included people from Hong Kong, Tibet, Burma and Vietnamese.

In Australia, although the Sydney rally was not part of the joint plan, it was still attended by about 700 people. The wanted former member of the Legislative Council, Ted Hui, took the stage to encourage overseas Hong Kong people to continue to speak up. Due to the epidemic in Melbourne, only 10 people are allowed to participate in the outdoor area. Participants changed to holding the 612 Second Anniversary Exhibition outside Federation Square and the State Library of Victoria.

In the United States, the New York rally was prepared by the Hong Kong people organization NY4HK. Alex Chow, the former chairman of the Federation of Students, who is currently studying abroad, gave a speech. The rally also set up a Lennon Wall, displaying a number of banners related to the anti-extradition bill protests.

In Europe, about 200 people participated in the rally at Alexanderplatz in Berlin. Ray Wong, the wanted front-line convener of the local democratic front, gave a speech in German. He pointed out that Hong Kong people need to recognize what their identity represents. And some people held symposiums in Copenhagen, and Oslo.

Approximately 250 people dressed in black took part in the parade in Tokyo. The parade held up yellow umbrellas and raised the black flag of Liberate Hong Kong, Revolution of Our Times. They paraded from Shinjuku Central Park to Shinjuku station and the main streets in the district. A large number of people watched.

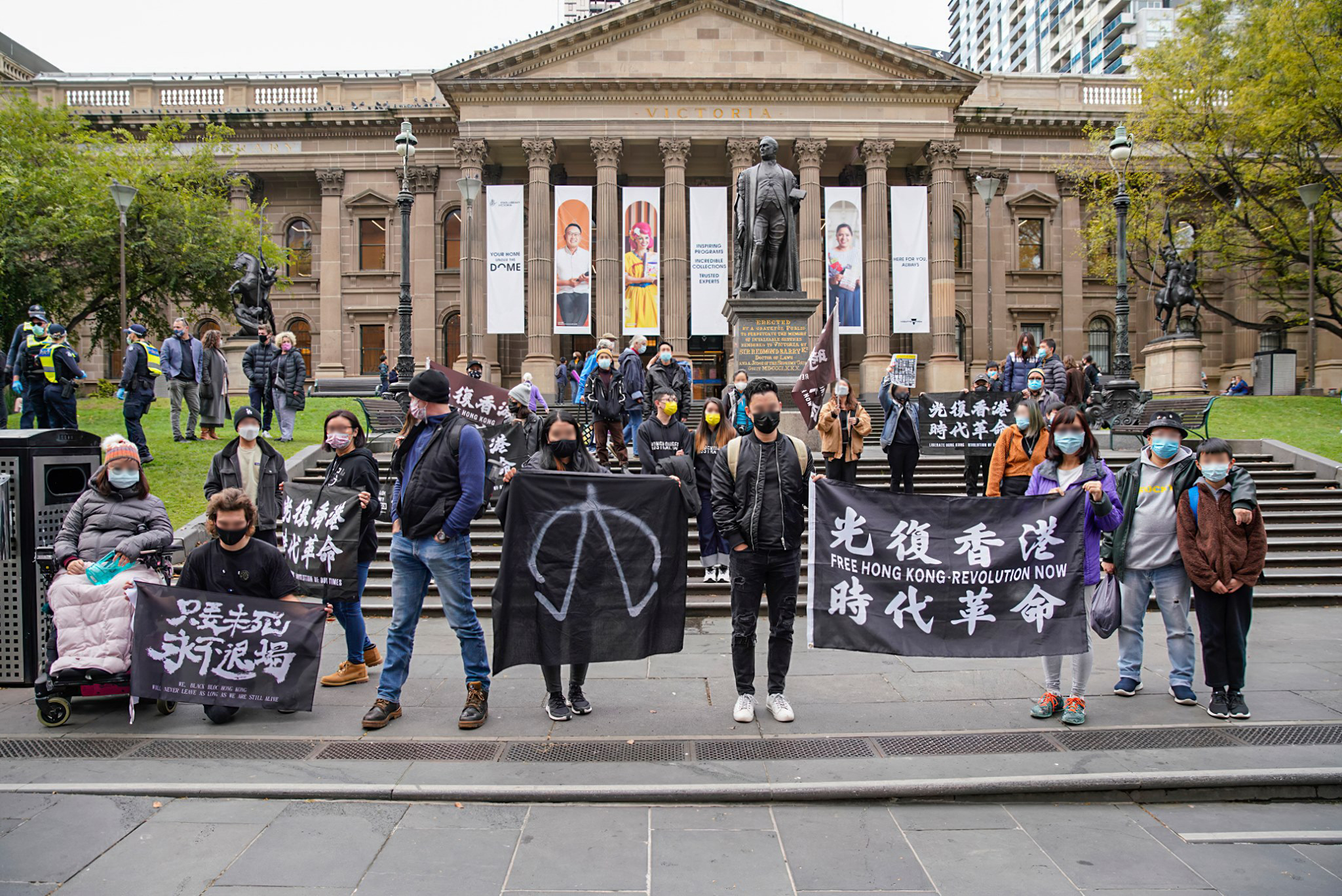
Due to the pandemic in Melbourne, only 10 people are allowed in the outdoor area. Participants held a gathering outside the State Library of Victoria

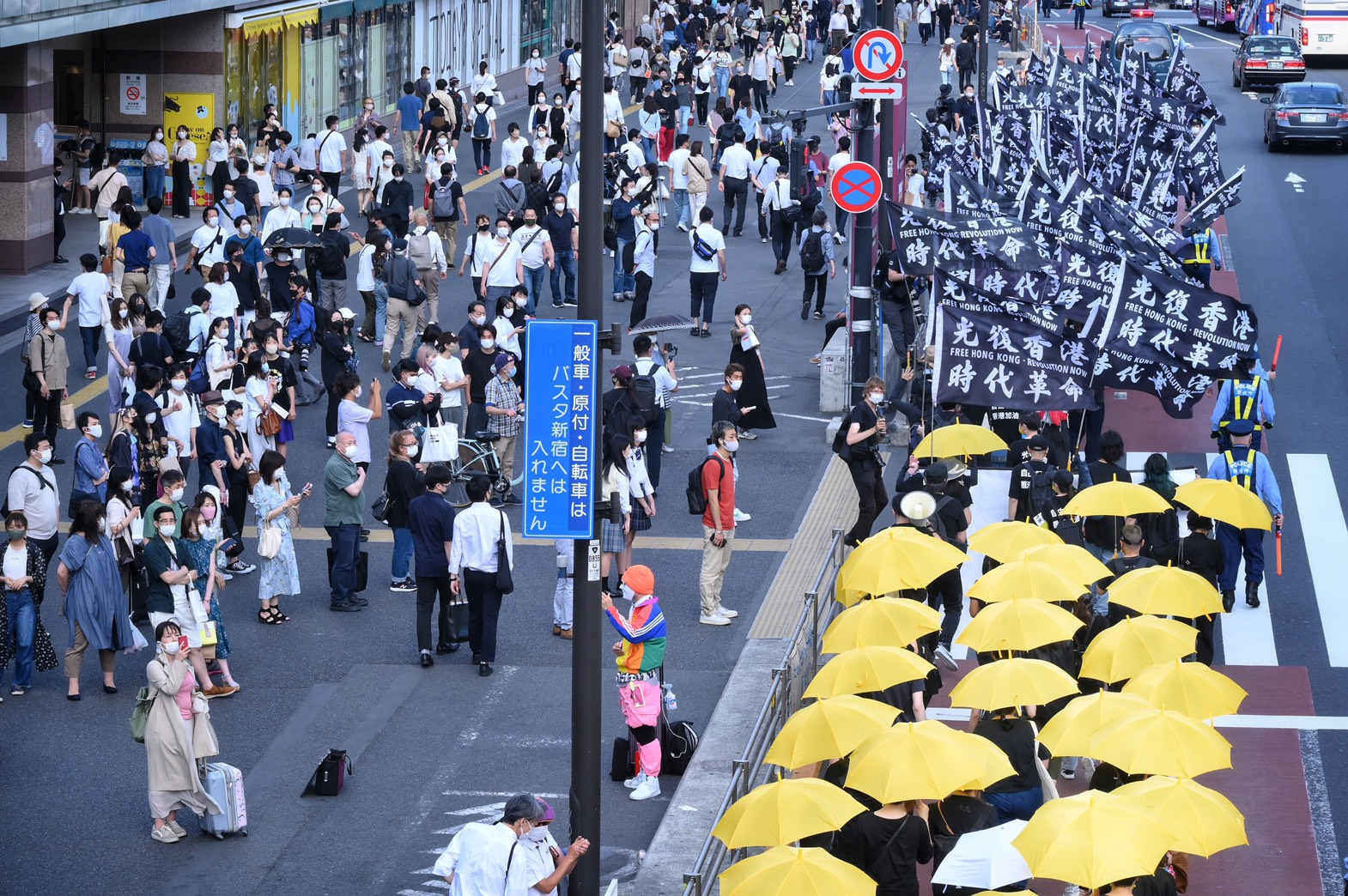
About 250 people dressed in black participated in the parade in Tokyo. Protesters held up yellow umbrellas and raised the black flag of Liberate Hong Kong, Revolution of Our Times

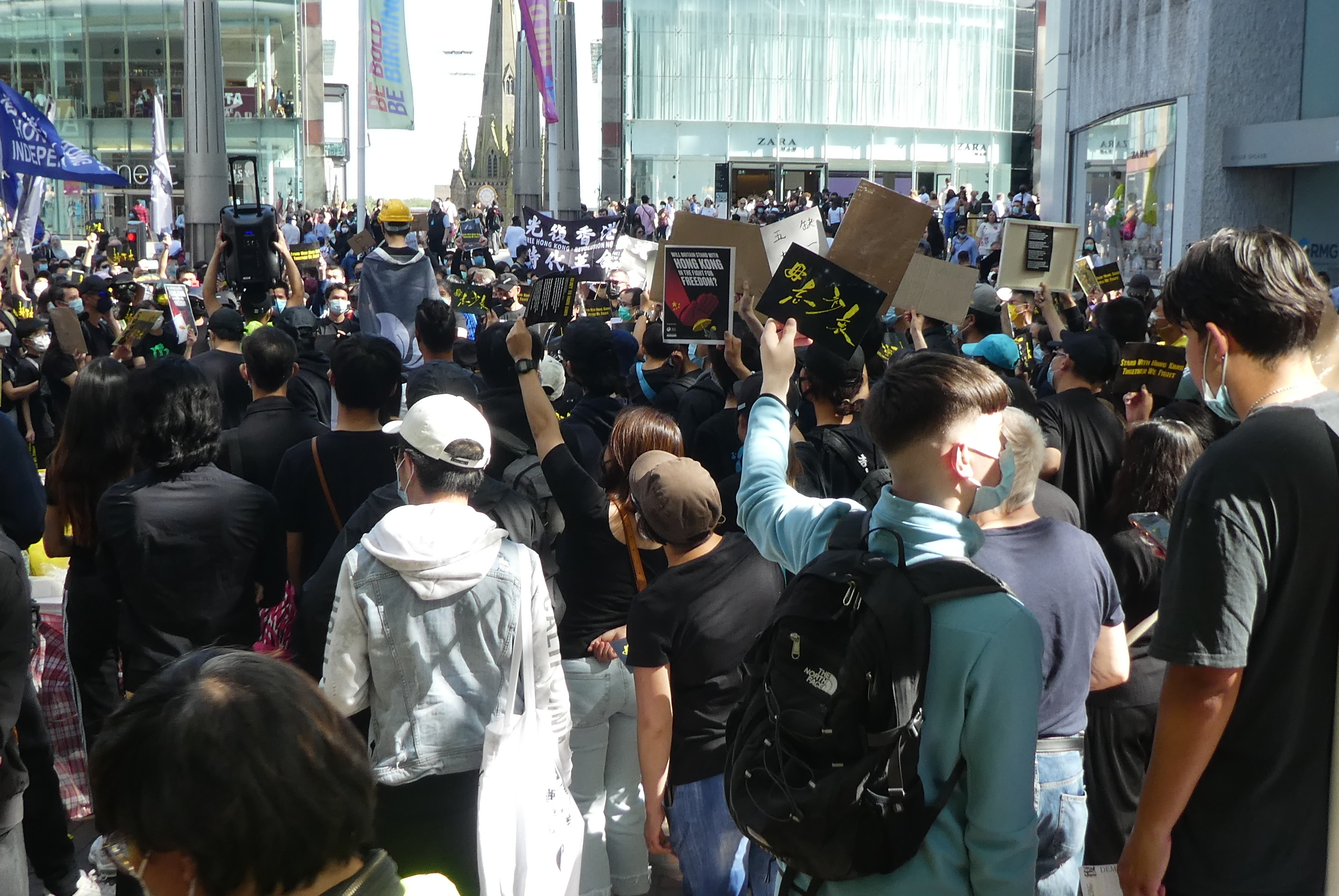
Over 300 people participated in the rally at Birmingham

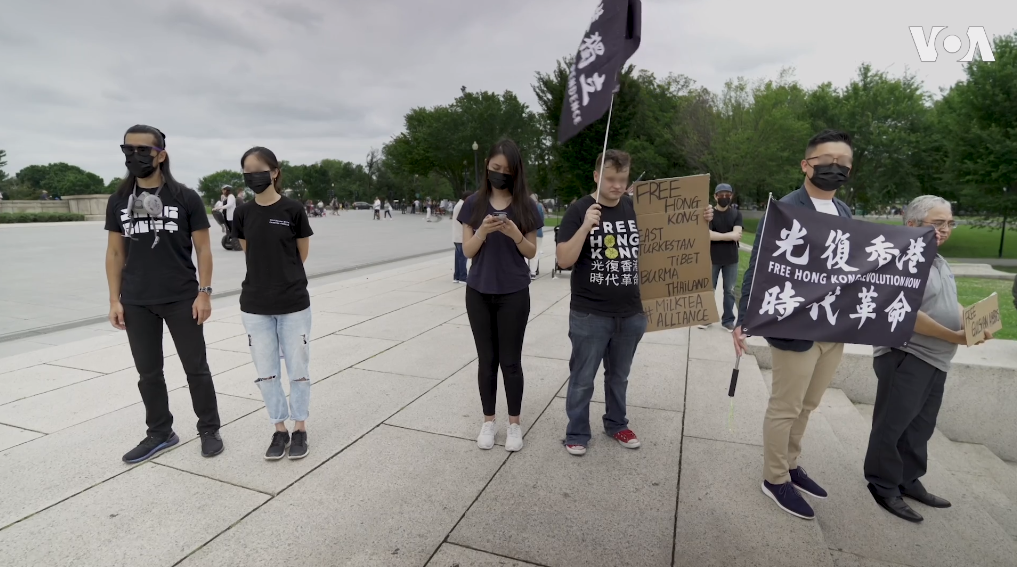
Small group held Hong Kong protest in Washington, D.C.

== 15 June ==
=== Second anniversary of Marco Leung's death ===
On the second anniversary of the death of Marco Leung, an anti-extradition bill protester, members of the organization Station Starter distributed white ribbons on the pedestrian bridge outside Hung Hom station in the morning, in units of two to three persons. However, during the packing of the supplies, they were suddenly surrounded by police officers, accusing them of violating the gathering restriction order, and the last 6 members were voted against. Yau Tsim Mong District Councillor Derek Chu sent a white ribbon to Mong Kok in the morning, and was once surrounded by an orange tape cordon pulled by the police.

In the afternoon, some citizens went to Pacific Place in Admiralty to send white flowers to greet them. From 5 pm onwards, more than 20 police officers came to the scene and pulled up orange belts to separate them. Police officers also intercepted some of the residents staying at the scene, and repeatedly urged the public to leave. At about 7 pm, after someone called the slogan Liberate Hong Kong, Revolution of Our Times in the Pacific Place mall, more than 20 police officers walked into the mall at 8 pm to guard and intercept citizens, and no one was arrested. In the 'flower bed' at the memorial site, flowers were placed, but there were also heart-warming cards, electronic candles and paper cranes. On the flower trough, there are words like "I will miss him forever" and "He was pushed down by the regime." Citizens who mourned said that it is impossible to forget this matter.

=== President of the American Chamber of Commerce says the boundaries of national security law was unclear ===
Tara Joseph, the president of the American Chamber of Commerce in Hong Kong, said when attending the China Conference forum organized by the South China Morning Post that the boundaries of the Hong Kong national security law were blurred. Many foreign companies and employees did not know where the 'red line' was. The discussion of power intervention also made foreign investors feel uneasy, and even caused some talents to leave Hong Kong. Secretary for Commerce and Economic Development, Edward Yau, said that he agreed that it is necessary to explain clearly the national security law red line and will clearly answer a large number of questions to the business community.

== 16 June ==
=== Magistrate apologizes for wrong sentence ===
A female reporter from the online media Ben Yu Entertainment, Ho Ka-yan, was convicted of resisting a female police constable who mistook her for a man in the public toilets at Sai Yee Street, Mong Kok, in the evening of a mass protest on 11 May 2020. Ho was acquitted of resisting three other police officers who had twice pepper-sprayed her, with Principal Magistrate Ada Yim Shun-yee saying that this had been inappropriate use of force.

The incident started when the constable took two female arrestees to the toilet on their request and initially mistook Ho, who was holding up a camera, for a man. The constable recalled Ho shouting, "Rogue cops are arresting people in the toilet." She called reinforcements to deal with the commotion that this caused outside the toilet, where people shouted for the arrestees to be let go. Three police officers arrived, and one of them, also believing that they were confronting a man trying to escape, quickly deployed pepper spray. It was only after Ho had been subdued, during which process she had banged her head against the floor, that he realized her to be female.

Taking into account the revelation during the proceedings that Ho had bipolar disorder, Magistrate Yim ordered a four-week sentence with two-year suspension. However, two hours later, the magistrate found that the suspension, and hence the sentence, was not feasible for the offence committed and instead adjourned the sentence until 17 July, and released Ho on bail.

== 17 June ==
=== Police raid Apple Daily newsroom and arrest its executives ===
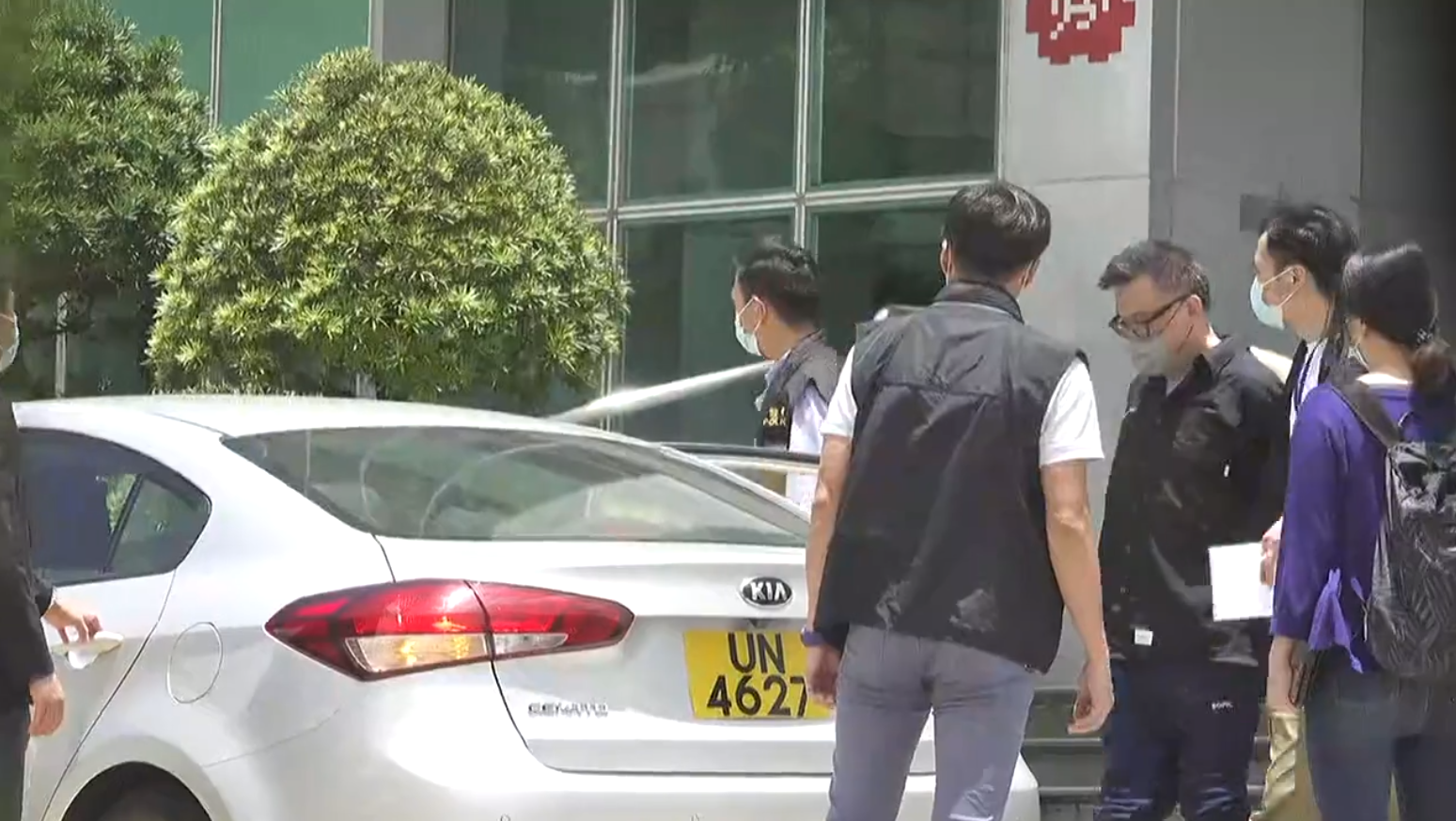
Cheung Chi-wai was taken away by police after searching for evidence

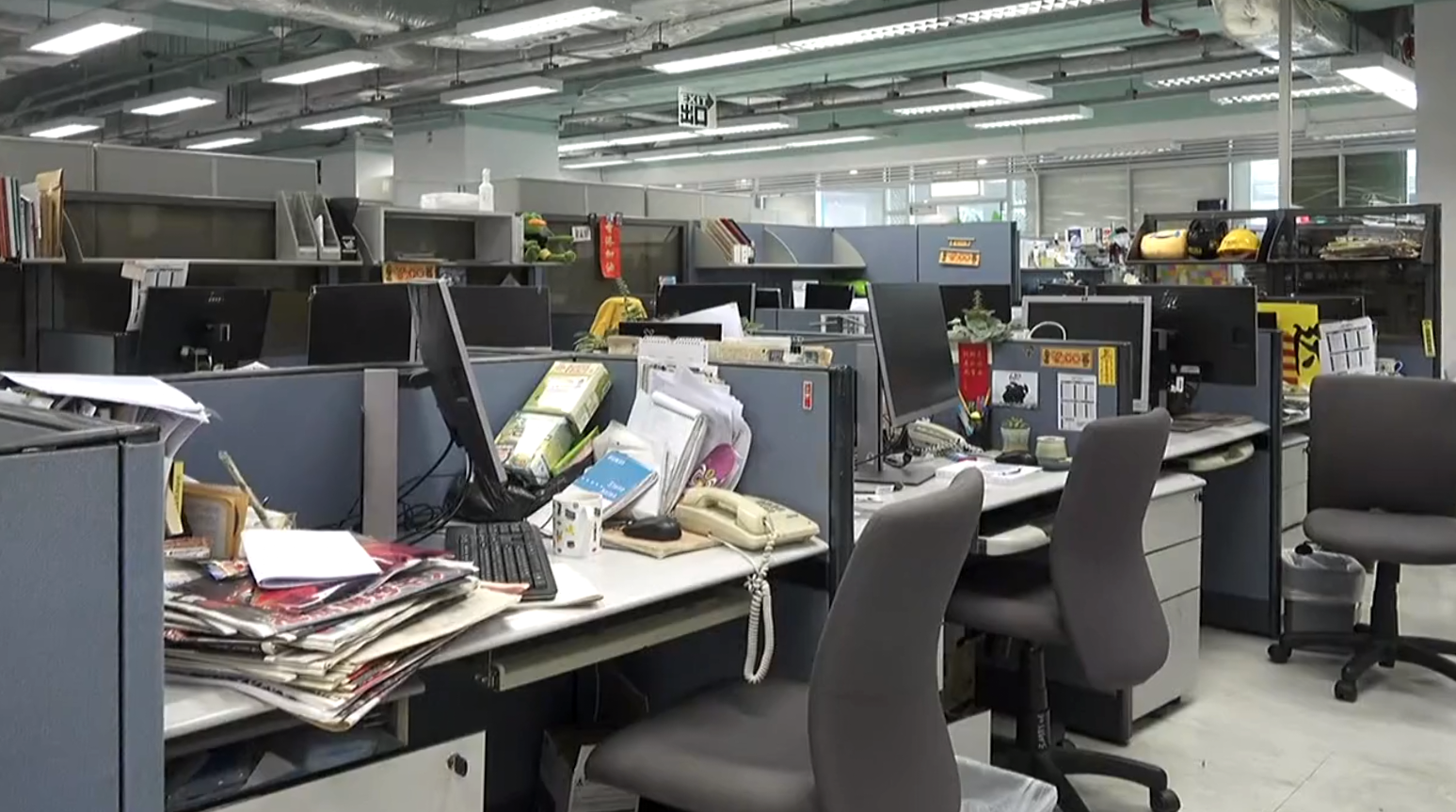
Inside one of the reporter desk after police raid

National Security Department of the Hong Kong Police arrested five executives of Apple Daily, including CEO of Next Digital Cheung Kim-hung, COO Chow Tat-kuen, editor-in-chief of Apple Daily Ryan Law, vice-president Chan Pui-man, and executive editor-in-chief Cheung Chi-wai. They were suspected of violating Article 29 of the Hong Kong national security law for 'conspiracy to collude with foreign or foreign forces to endanger national security', and the police have also searched the arrested person's residence.

On the same day, the police dispatched more than 500 police officers and National Security Department officers to conduct another raid on the Apple Daily headquarters. The search warrant also granted the police the power to search for news materials. The officers claimed that the building was a 'crime scene,' demanded everyone in the building to put down their work, and asked to go to the underground vacant ground or the staff restaurant on the 5th floor. The detectives randomly searched the documents on the reporter's desk and the information in the computer. When the reporters was shooting the interview, they were stopped by the police. Afterwards, Apple Daily stated that 38 computers belonging to the editorial department were seized by the police and contained a large amount of news materials. However, employees still work as usual with private and company backup computers, saying that they will print newspapers as usual, and they have decided to print more than 500,000 copies of the newspapers published on the next day.

Senior Superintendent Li Kwai-wah of the National Security Department explained the incident at 11 am, said that more than 500 police forces were used in the operation this morning. The police had frozen the assets of three companies, including Apple Daily, Apple Printing and AD Internet Limited totaling HK418 million. Since 2019, Apple Daily has contained dozens of articles calling for foreign sanctions against the CCP and the SAR government.

At noon, Secretary for Security John Lee said on a press conference that the arrest operation is aimed at the suspected use of journalism as a tool to endanger national security. The property frozen this time is the property of suspected criminals. He said for those who try to use journalism as an umbrella or cover to commit crimes that endanger national security, the SAR government will definitely take the most severe measures to crack down in accordance with the law. And he stated that he would not publish the articles involved in the case, nor did he respond positively to whether it was illegal for the public to subscribe to Apple Daily.

After the raids, eight media unions, including the Hong Kong Journalists Association, Hong Kong Photographers Association and Next Digital Trade Union, issued a joint statement saying that the incident caused panic in the industry and made the media and the public worried that the national security law was 'weaponized.' Hong Kong News Executives Association also issued a statement expressing concern, but the statement also emphasized that journalists must abide by the law.

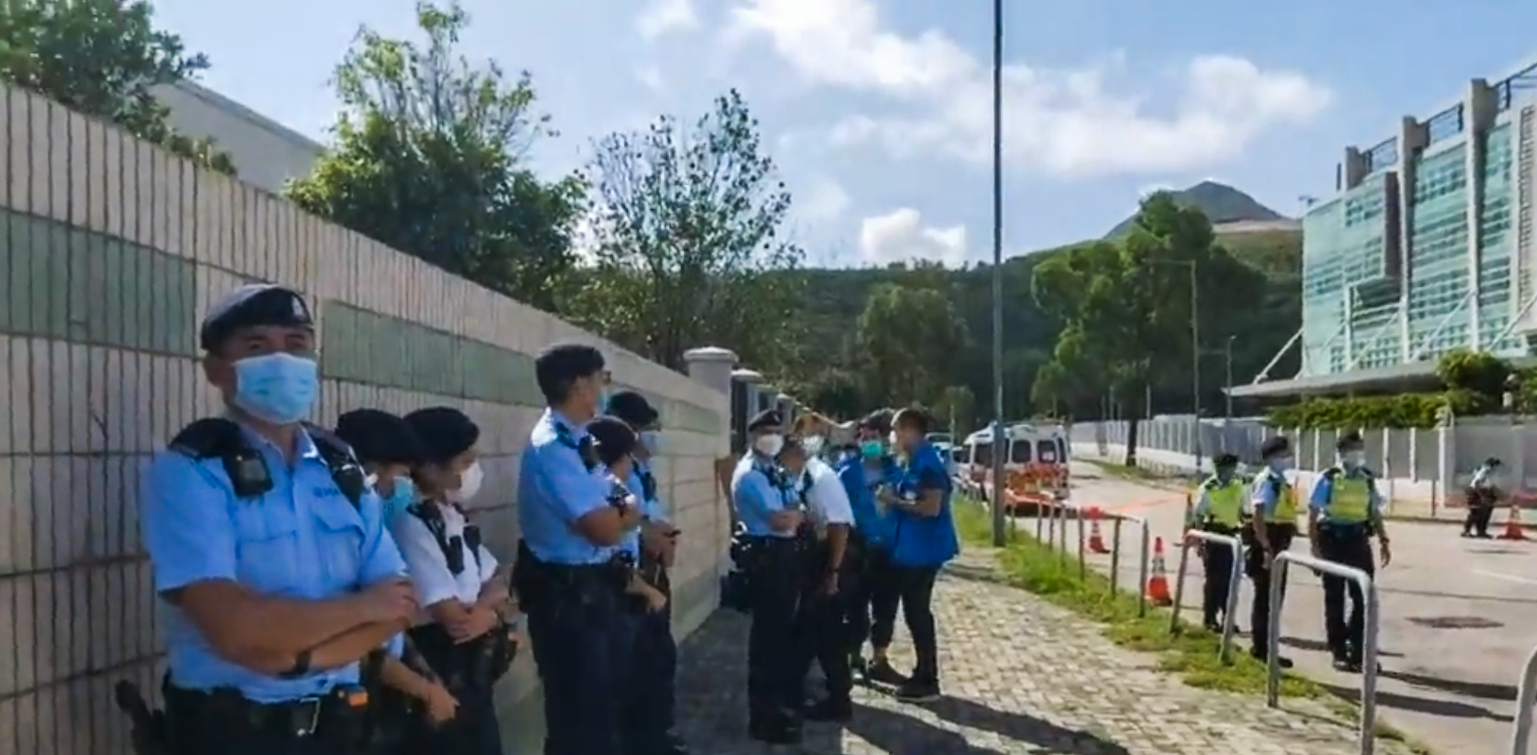
A number of police officers are seen guarding outside the Apple Daily building

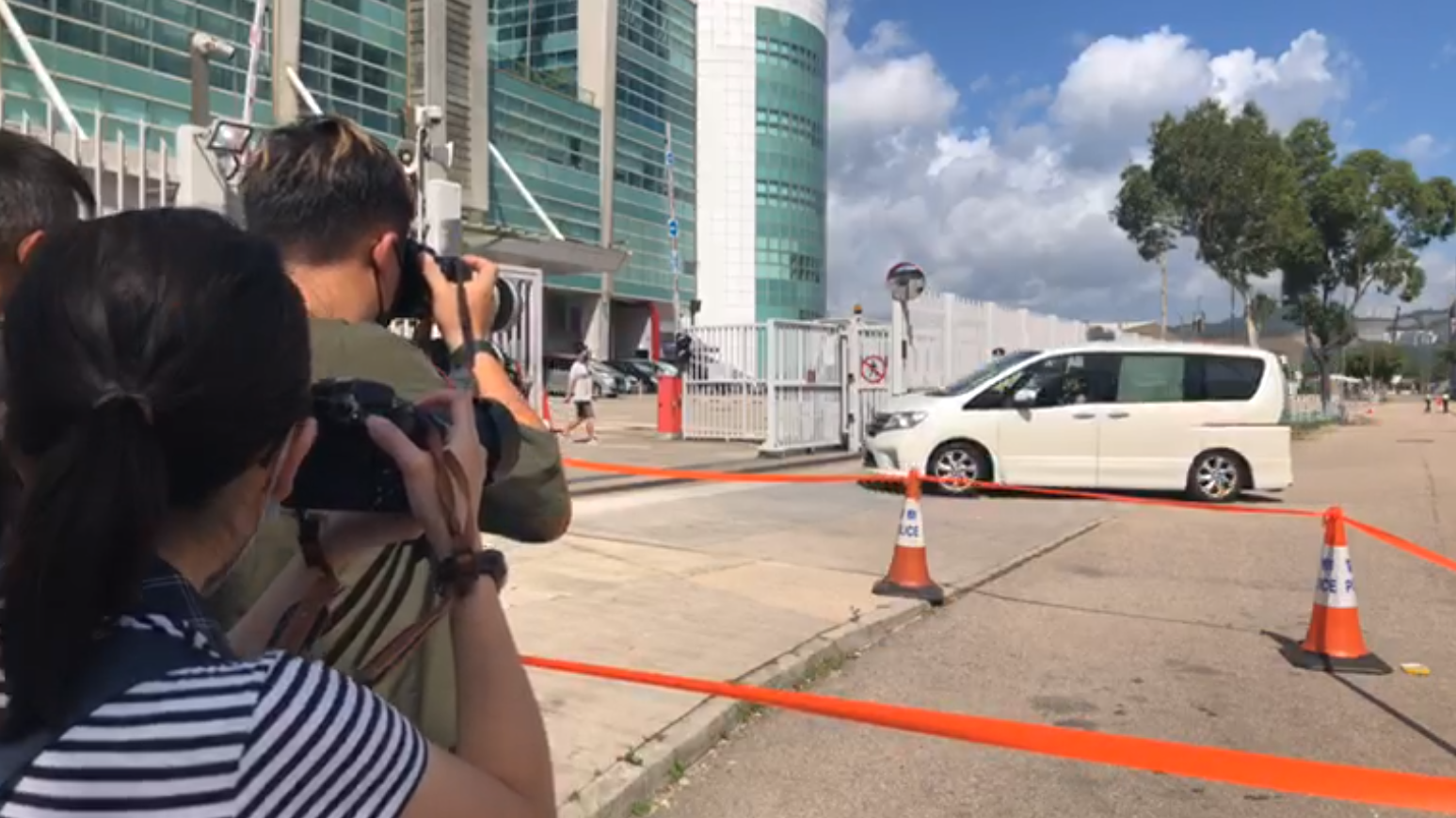
The arrested director of Apple Daily arrived at the building in a police car to search for evidence

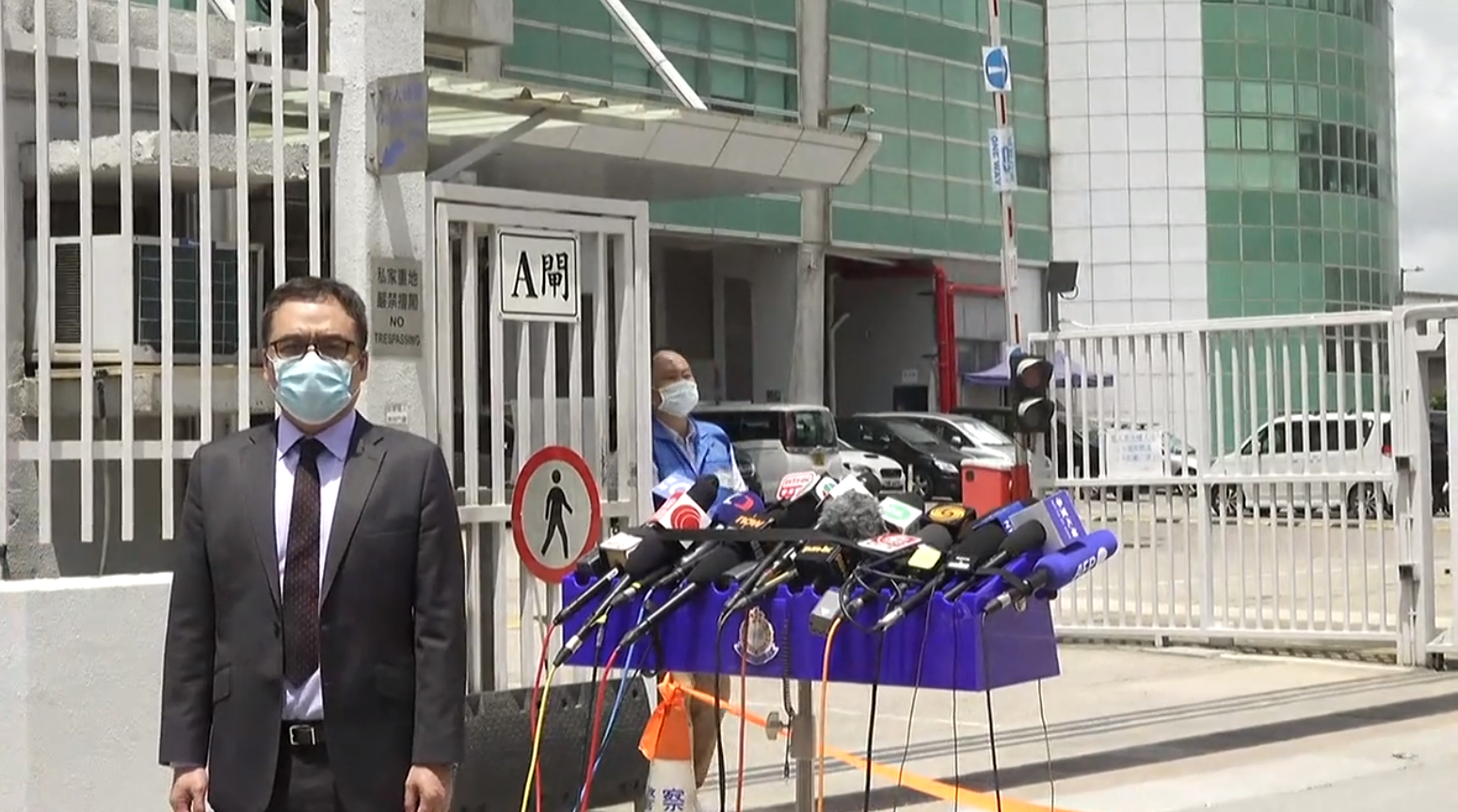
Senior Superintendent of the National Security Department Li Kwai-wah meets with the media outside the Apple Daily headquarters

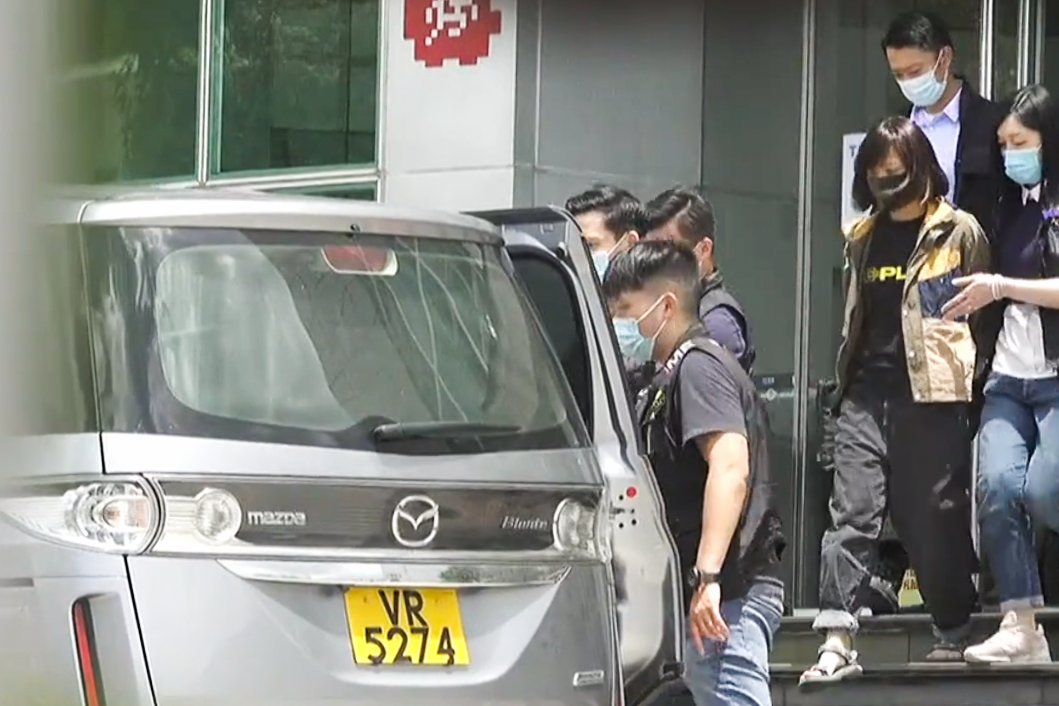
Apple Daily vice-president Chan Pui-man were taken away by police

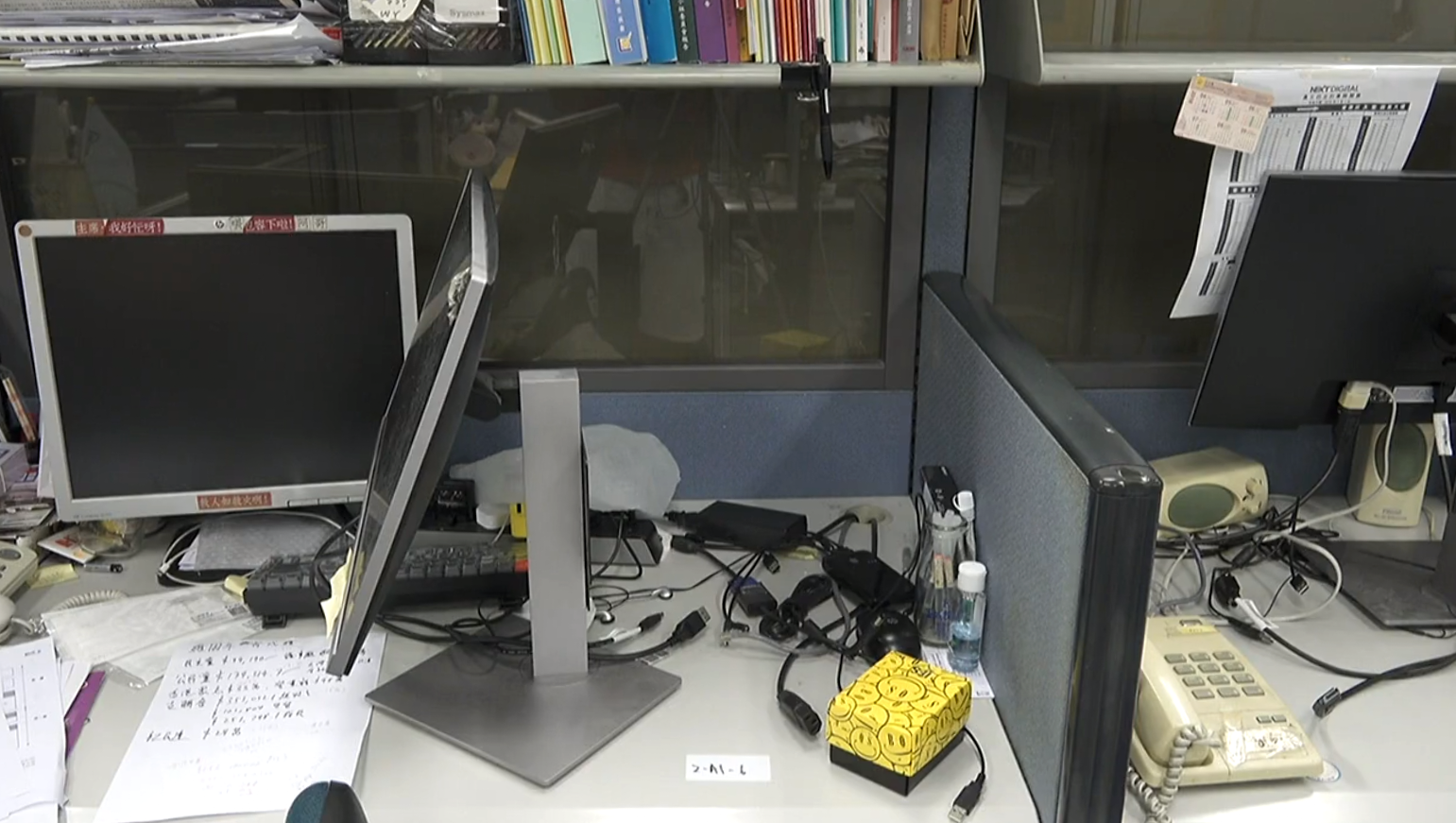
One of the journalist desks after raided by police

=== Department of Justice drops charge on Ta Kung Pao reporter's license plate search ===
After Choy Yuk-ling, producer and director of Hong Kong Connection, was charged for car license plate searches, the reporter of Ta Kung Pao Wong Wai-keung was also charged for using the same method to check the owner's information. Although the nature of the two cases is roughly the same, the charges are the same, the same search method is used, and the same prosecutor and chief magistrate are responsible. But the legal consequences are different. The reporter of Ta Kung Pao was allowed to sign a conservative behavior for 12 months at HK$2,000, and was required to pay HK$1,000 as a court fee. However, Choy's case was convicted and fined a total of HK$6,000, with a record of the case. The senior prosecutor of the Department of Justice, Vincent Lee, still emphasized that the criteria and criteria for consideration in the Choy's case are exactly the same.

== 18 June ==
=== Eight men on Yuen Long attacks convicted ===
Eight men who was involved during Yuen Long attack were charged with rioting and wounding with intent. Two of them pleaded guilty to rioting, and the remaining 6 pleaded not guilty and were tried. After 24 days of trial, District Court judge Eddie Yip pointed out that the faces of the first defendant and the person in the clip were not completely similar, and that he could not prove that he was the assailant in the film. In addition, the clothes worn by the person in the film could not be found at home, and the verdict was not guilty. The remaining five people were all convicted of rioting and wounding with intent, and they need to be remanded until 22 July for sentence. The judge also mentioned that although the defendant accused Lam Cheuk-ting, a member of the LegCo at the time, of "making trouble," the clip saw that Lam was pacifying others and said that he had called the police to think that the accusations are 'unjustified.'

=== Former staff of the Museum of History sentenced to half a year in prison ===
On 17 November 2019, a 44-year-old male outsourced worker of the Hong Kong Museum of History, Chan Chi-wah, photographed a police flying tiger team armed with a gun on the back stairs of the museum and posted the picture to the Internet. He was subsequently charged with one count of 'obstructing a police officer in the proper execution of his duties'. He lost his job and denied the charge earlier. The magistrate believed that the behavior was "briefing" and intended to assist the "brothers" during the Siege of the Hong Kong Polytechnic University. Cheng thought the case was serious and pointed out that the defendant had no regrets, and sentenced the defendant to immediate imprisonment for 6 months, and refused him to be released on bail pending appeal.

== 20 June ==
=== Five people flee to Taiwan then to the US via Switzerland ===
American newspaper The Wall Street Journal interviewed three young people who had participated in the anti-extradition bill protests during the absconding process. They alleged that they smuggled to Taiwan by water in July 2020, and were intercepted by the Taiwan Coast Guard and placed in Kaohsiung. Some members have expressed their wish to stay in Taiwan, but the Taiwan side is worried that the Beijing government will act with excuses. After the U.S. State Department learned of the incident, they took a passenger plane via Switzerland and then transferred to the U.S.

== 21 June ==
=== Man arrested for hanging a protest flag ===
At about 5:30 pm, someone reported that someone had hung the banner of Liberate Hong Kong, Revolution of Our Times outside a flat on Fife Street, Mong Kok. After that, 20 police officers went upstairs, removed the banner and arrested a 40-year-old man, accused him of publishing seditious texts. During this period, the residents of the building had to be accompanied by police officers to go upstairs, and the police officers patrolled nearby.

== 22 June ==
=== Owen Chow released on bail ===
Owen Chow, who was charged with 'conspiracy to subvert state power' for participating in pro-democracy primary elections, applied for bail to High Court judge Esther Toh, and his bail approved. However, there are a number of bail conditions that must be observed, including not publishing remarks deemed harmful to national security, not participating in any elections, daily curfews, daily reporting to designated police stations, and not seeing foreign officials. He left the court in a suit at nearly 7 pm, saying that "bad times are a hotbed for good works."

=== Lawyer for American bank convicted for attacking police ===
When an off-duty policeman questioned a commuter at MTR Causeway Bay station on 7 December 2019 who he believed had attacked and thereby prevented him from catching a fare evader, a Bank of America Securities counsel and witness to the conversation, Samuel Phillip Bickett, was allegedly punching the officer in his face and kneeled on his body in the subsequent scuffle. Beckett was charged for assaulting a police officer and alternate ordinary assault crimes. The magistrate of the Eastern Magistrates' Court Arthur Lam said that the police officer who was attacked had repeatedly stated his identity as a police officer, after originally having denied it. Lam did not accept that the defendant was worried that other passengers at the station had been in danger, saying that it was "perfectly understandable" for the police officer to initially deny his identity as policeman, which the commuter had referred to with the derogatory term "popo", and that Bickett could have simply asked the officer to put away his baton. He ruled that Bickett's sole intention was to snatch the baton from the officer. The case was adjourned to a ruling on 6 July, and the defendant remanded. Bickett issued a statement after the ruling, saying that the ruling was completely lacking in legal and evidence support. He stated that he would appeal until justice is demonstrated.

== 24 June ==
=== Closure of Apple Daily ===
In the early morning of 24 June, Apple Daily website, mobile app, Facebook and YouTube channels stopped updating. Facebook and YouTube channels were the first to delete content and shut down completely, including Next Magazine, Lifestyle and Eat and Travel Weekly. The website and mobile application were closed at 12:40 am and 1:30 am, respectively.

In terms of physical newspapers, at 12:50 am on 24 June, the first batch of Apple Daily was put on sale at Prince News Store. At nearly 1 am, the newspaper cart carrying Apple Daily arrived in Mong Kok. At the newspaper stall at the junction of Sai Yeung Choi Street Street and Argyle Street in Mong Kok, there were already more than a thousand people queuing to buy the last issue of Apple Daily. In the daytime, there were queues to buy Apple Daily in many places in Hong Kong, and many convenience stores have been sold out. AbouThai Department Store also purchased Apple Daily, attracting readers to wait in long queues to buy. Some newspaper vendors even set up prices on the spot, and some people speculated on the Internet up to HK$1,000. In the afternoon, Apple Daily in some convenience stores was sold out. At 6:30 p.m. that day, nearly one million copies of Apple Daily were sold.

The news that Apple Daily ceased operations attracted the attention of the international community. Chief Cabinet Secretary Katsunobu Kato expressed his deep concern about the incident. The front page of Japan's Sankei Shimbun published the report of the last issue of the Apple Daily, and in Chinese, "Friends, Apples, waiting for your return!" For the title, it was published as an editorial. International media such as the BBC, British The Guardian, NHK, CNN and The New York Times also reported the cease of publications. Taiwanese President Tsai Ing-wen and U.S. President Joe Biden also issued statements in response.

== 27 June ==
=== Security Bureau condition to hand over all employees' personal data and funds ===
South China Morning Post reported that the Security Bureau had asked, as part of its negotiations with the parent company Next Digital over unfreezing assets to pay employees after Apple Daily ceased publication on 24 June, for personal data, including a list of employee names. Some former Apple Daily employees expressed opposition to this move, worrying that the disclosure of personal information might incur reprisals from the authorities. A member of the Next Media Trade Union said that employees' consent would have to be obtained if personal data was to be passed on to third parties.

=== Stand News temporarily removes article and executive resigns ===
In the evening, online news media Stand News issued a statement in the evening, stating that after the implementation of the national security law, "speech crimes" had arrived in Hong Kong. In order to reduce the risk, blogs, readers' contributions and reposted comments and other articles from May and before were temporarily removed, and membership funding was suspended. Six of the eight members of the board of directors proposed to resign, and the company will terminate the employment contract for employees who have been employed in May this year and who have been in the company for more than half a year for conditions for re-hiring. The statement also stated that the company will continue to operate and that the current fiscal reserves can cover the next 9 to 12 months of expenditure.

=== Former Apple Daily English edition editor arrested at the airport ===
Fung Wai-kong, the former executive editor-in-chief and chief writer of the English edition of Apple Daily (pen name Li Ping), was banned from leaving the country and arrested by the Hong Kong police when he was about to leave from Hong Kong International Airport for the UK at night.

== 28 June ==
=== Internet media announces the removal of all archives and the withdrawal from Hong Kong ===
Under the gloom of the Hong Kong national security law, the online media Post 852 announced that all archives would be removed from the shelves. The founder Yau Ching-yuen said that he would only talk about history, not politics in the YouTube channel of Post 852; the previous evening, the organization had taken down all its videos. The IT and news website Winandmac stated that it has withdrawn from Hong Kong based on safety considerations and canceled the relevant business registration in Hong Kong. In the evening, Hong Kong Journalists Association issued a statement saying that the incident reflected the 'white terror' in Hong Kong covering the news industry. It expressed extreme concern that the media would need to remove reports and comments to "guarantee safety" and even "leave Hong Kong to ensure safety" for the entire organization.

=== Man arrested for displaying Liberate Hong Kong stickers ===
The police stated that they received a report on 26 June, alleging that a batch of stickers posted on the iron gate of the unit owned by a 37-year-old man in Yiu Tung Village, Shau Kei Wan was violating the sedition provision of the national security law. According to reports, the stickers showed the outlawed slogan Liberate Hong Kong. The man was arrested for seditious intent. He has been released on bail pending investigation. The case is being followed up by the National Security Department. In addition, officers from the National Security Department arrested a 36-year-old woman on suspicion of 'seditious intent' in connection with the case where a Chinese mansion unit on Fife Street in Mong Kok was hung with a black flag with the words Liberate Hong Kong. Two people have been arrested for investigation.

== 30 June ==
=== Multiple democratic organizations and groups disbanded ===
Ming Pao checked the data in the past year and found that at least 21 political groups, coalitions and trade unions ceased operations before and after the national security law took effect. Including regional organizations Kickstart Wan Chai, Power for Democracy, Community Sha Tin, Neo Democrats, which has been established for more than 10 years, Médecins Inspirés, Frontline Doctors Union, g0vhk, Hong Kong Outlanders, Ekklesia Hong Kong, and Progressive Lawyers Group, which is composed of members of the pan-civilian legal profession, etc.
