= Hong Kong Journalists Association v Commissioner for Transport =

2026 Hong Kong judicial review decision

- Court of First Instance of the High Court
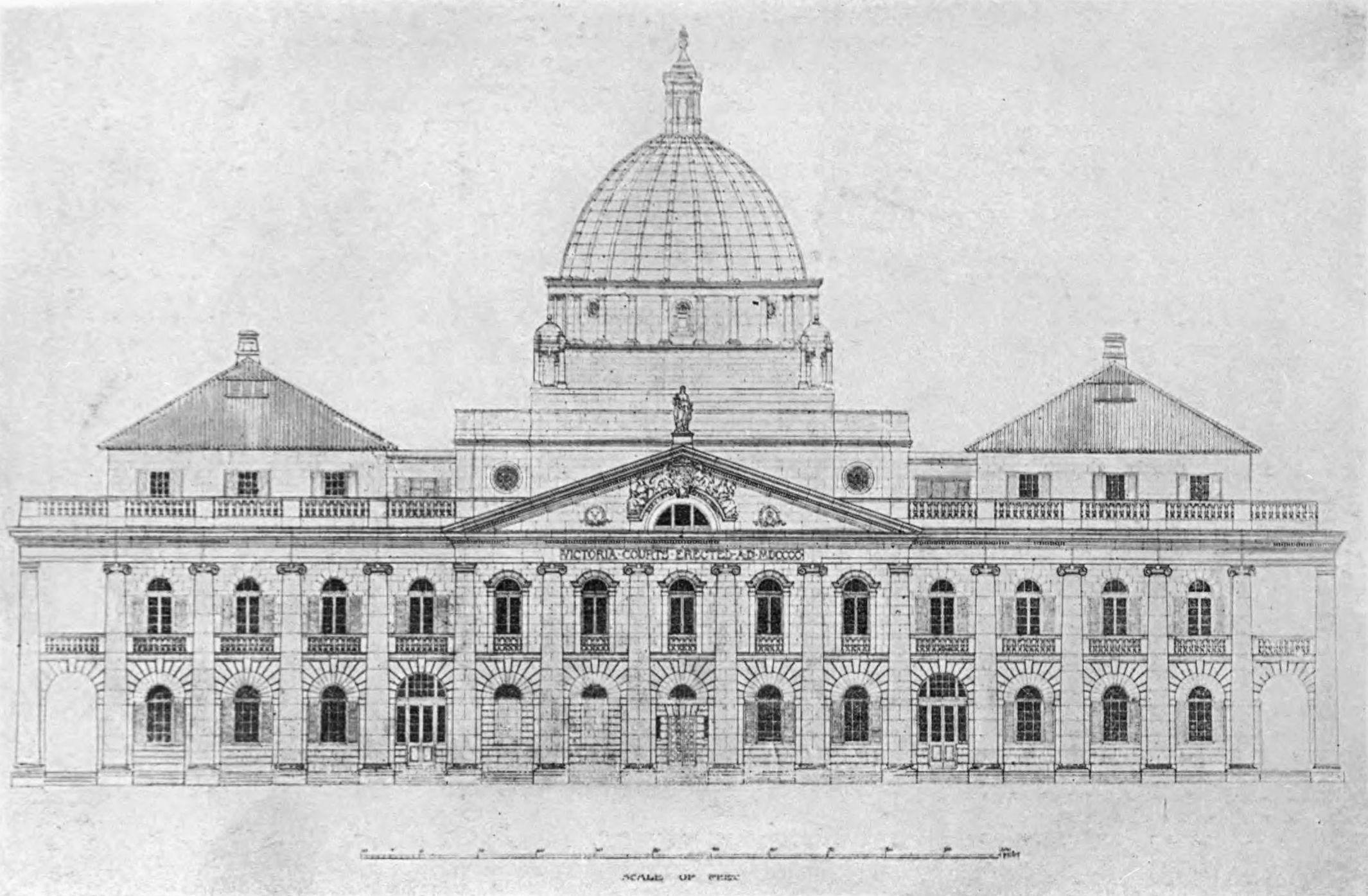
- Judiciary of Hong Kong
- Full case name: The Hong Kong Journalists Association v The Commissioner for Transport
- Decided: 6 March 2026
- Case numbers: HCAL 559/2024
- Neutral citation: [2026] HKCFI 917
- Language: English
- Transcript: [2026] HKCFI 917

Court membership
- Judges sitting: Russell Coleman J (as he then was)

Hong Kong Journalists Association v Commissioner for Transport [2026] HKCFI 917 is a 2026 Hong Kong judicial review decision concerning journalists' access to personal information in the government's Register of Vehicles and the relationship between freedom of the press and the right to privacy.

The Hong Kong Journalists Association (HKJA) challenged a policy introduced by the Transport Department in January 2024 under which applications for vehicle particulars made for journalistic purposes had to be considered under an exceptional-circumstances procedure, referred to by the court as the "Public Interest Route", rather than the "Automatic Route" available for specified purposes. The policy was introduced following the Court of Final Appeal's decision in HKSAR v Choy Yuk Ling (2023) 26 HKCFAR 185, which quashed the conviction of journalist Choy Yuk-ling for making allegedly false statements when obtaining vehicle-registration information while investigating the 2019 Yuen Long attack.

Coleman J (as he then was) dismissed the HKJA's challenge on all five grounds. The court held that the policy engaged both freedom of expression and freedom of the press and vehicle owners' privacy, and applied a "double proportionality" analysis under which neither right was presumed to take priority over the other. Coleman held that requiring journalistic applications to undergo additional scrutiny was a proportionate means of protecting privacy and did not amount to a blanket denial of access for bona fide journalism. JURIST described the judgment as treating the policy as a compromise between press freedom and vehicle owners' privacy.

The court nevertheless held that part of the Transport Department's description of the statutory purposes of the Register was erroneous and should be corrected. In a postscript, Coleman stated that the lengthy processing times experienced by some early journalistic applicants should not continue once the initial problems of implementing the policy had passed, and that properly credentialed journalists giving cogent reasons should ordinarily have their applications assessed without a delay of many weeks.

== Background ==
=== Vehicle register and journalistic searches ===
The Commissioner for Transport is required to maintain a Register of Vehicles under the Road Traffic Ordinance and the Road Traffic (Registration and Licensing of Vehicles) Regulations. The register contains 18 categories of information, including a vehicle's registration mark, the registered owner's full name and residential address, identity-document information and particulars concerning the vehicle itself.

Before January 2024, the Transport Department's policy was that, upon payment of the prescribed fee, a certificate containing vehicle particulars would be supplied to an applicant. Administrative measures introduced in 2003 asked applicants to state the purpose of a search, but journalists and news organisations had long used the register for newsgathering.

The government had considered restricting access to vehicle-owner information in 2011 in order to enhance privacy protection and ensure that personal data was properly used, but the proposed changes were not implemented.

=== HKSAR v Choy Yuk Ling ===
Choy Yuk-ling, then a contracted journalist for RTHK, obtained vehicle particulars while making an episode of the investigative programme Hong Kong Connection concerning the events in Yuen Long on 21 July 2019. Her investigation concerned a vehicle suspected of having been used to transport weapons to people involved in the incident.

Under the online application system then in force, applicants were required to select a purpose from a menu. Choy selected "other traffic and transport related matters". She was subsequently convicted of two counts under section 111(3)(a) of the Road Traffic Ordinance on the basis that her actual purpose was investigative journalism and that the selection was therefore false. She was fined HK$6,000.

The Court of Final Appeal quashed the convictions in June 2023. It held that "other traffic and transport related matters" was a broadly worded catch-all category capable of encompassing Choy's bona fide journalistic investigation into the use of the vehicle. The Court of Final Appeal preferred the broader construction partly because it gave effect to the constitutionally protected freedom of speech and of the press.

The Court of Final Appeal did not, however, accept that regulation 4(2) imposed an absolute obligation on the Commissioner to disclose vehicle particulars to anyone who paid the prescribed fee regardless of the purpose of the request. It held that the Commissioner was responsible for managing personal data contained in the register, could require applicants to identify the purpose for which information was sought, and could limit the purposes for which vehicle particulars would be supplied.

=== 2024 policy ===
Following Choy Yuk Ling, the government announced that it would review the procedure for issuing certificates of vehicle particulars. A new policy was announced on 5 January 2024 and implemented on 8 January. Media coverage described the change as introducing additional hurdles for journalists seeking vehicle information.

The new policy provided two routes for obtaining information. Applications satisfying specified conditions or purposes could be processed through what Coleman later called the "Automatic Route". Other applications, including those made for journalistic purposes, could be considered under an exceptional-circumstances procedure called the "Public Interest Route". The Department of Justice later summarised the policy as requiring journalistic applications to proceed through the Public Interest Route because journalism did not fall within the specified purposes or general conditions for automatic processing.

Under the Public Interest Route, applicants were required to explain the reasons for seeking the information and the public interest involved, provide supporting material where appropriate, and address matters including whether the information was obtainable by alternative means and how the requested particulars would be used. The Commissioner was required to consider whether the public interest in disclosure outweighed the registered owner's privacy and the rights and interests of other persons and society as a whole.

Journalistic activity was not itself one of the specified purposes permitting automatic access. The HKJA argued that this subjected reporters to greater prior scrutiny, additional criteria, greater complexity and potentially substantial delay. In April 2024, the South China Morning Post reported that no applications by journalists had been approved during the first three months of the new regime.

In July 2024, before the Court of First Instance had determined the HKJA's challenge, legal scholar Mei Ning Yan in the article journal Amicus curiae argued that the Court of Final Appeal's decision had been "overturned by the Government's new measures", which she said "in effect prevent any search of the register for journalistic purposes". Her article situated the dispute within the broader question of whether Hong Kong law protects a right to newsgathering.

== Judicial review proceedings ==
The HKJA applied for judicial review in April 2024. It challenged the policy and revised application form, delays in the determination of applications by journalists, and the rejection of several individual applications.

The association advanced five grounds of review. It contended that the policy was ultra vires the Road Traffic Ordinance and its subsidiary legislation; constituted a disproportionate restriction on freedom of expression and freedom of the press; was irrational under the Wednesbury standard; unlawfully fettered the Commissioner's discretion; and that delays and refusals in individual applications were unlawful, irrational or unconstitutional.

The individual applications considered in the proceedings included applications by journalists from HK01, Ming Pao, Now TV and The Collective (集誌社), a Hong Kong news outlet. Several concerned vehicles associated with the 2019 Yuen Long attack, while others concerned a traffic accident, a personalised registration mark, alleged illegal dumping and other matters.

At the substantive hearing on 24 September 2024, Nigel Kat SC, appearing for the HKJA, argued that the revised policy was inconsistent with the Court of Final Appeal's decision and imposed unjustified obstacles on constitutionally protected journalistic newsgathering. Benjamin Yu SC, appearing for the Commissioner, argued that the Commissioner had a duty to act as a "gatekeeper" for private information in the vehicle register and that journalists had no automatic entitlement to such data.

Following the September 2024 hearing, the parties sought and obtained leave in February 2026 to adduce additional evidence concerning an application under exceptional circumstances and to make further submissions. Judgment was delivered on 6 March 2026.

== Judgment ==
=== Statutory purpose and ultra vires challenge ===
The HKJA argued that excluding journalism from the specified purposes under the Automatic Route frustrated the broad statutory purposes recognised in Choy Yuk Ling and was therefore ultra vires.

Coleman accepted part of that argument. He rejected the Commissioner's submission that the relevant statutory purposes were essentially confined to matters necessary or incidental to the acquisition, ownership and use of a vehicle. He held that journalistic activity could itself be incidental to vehicle ownership or use, giving a journalistic investigation of a traffic accident as an example.

Coleman also considered the Guidance Notes internally inconsistent. They described the purposes of the Register as including the provision of information to persons directly affected by vehicle ownership or use who consequently needed to ascertain the relevant particulars, while simultaneously providing a Public Interest Route designed for applicants who frequently would not satisfy that description.

He described this as a mismatch arising from the Commissioner's misconception of at least part of the statutory purposes of the Register. The error did not, however, render the policy as a whole unlawful. Coleman held that Choy Yuk Ling permitted the Commissioner to devise an application process and limit the purposes for which vehicle particulars would be supplied, while the Public Interest Route preserved an avenue through which bona fide journalistic applications could succeed.

Coleman emphasised that the Public Interest Route was one of the routes created by the policy itself rather than an external exception. Although journalistic activity could fall within the statutory purposes of the Register, that did not mean journalistic applications had to be approved automatically.

The HKJA also relied on section 61 of the Personal Data (Privacy) Ordinance, which contains exemptions relating to news activity. Coleman held that the provision did not create a blanket exemption for journalists or impose a positive duty on the Commissioner to disclose personal information for journalistic purposes. Rather, the public-interest requirements in section 61 were consistent with the Commissioner's need to undertake a balancing exercise before disclosure.

Coleman therefore held that the policy was not ultra vires the Road Traffic Ordinance or the relevant regulations.

=== Proportionality and competing rights ===
The court accepted that the policy engaged freedom of expression and freedom of the press under Article 27 of the Basic Law and Article 16 of the Hong Kong Bill of Rights. It also accepted that disclosure of vehicle owners' personal information engaged the right to privacy.

The HKJA identified three broad restrictions on journalistic applications: prior scrutiny of the purpose of an investigation, additional criteria and supporting-material requirements, and the greater complexity and delay of the Public Interest Route.

Coleman set out the conventional four-stage proportionality test derived from Hysan Development Co Ltd v Town Planning Board [2016] HKCFA 66, (2016) 19 HKCFAR 372: whether the measure pursued a legitimate aim, whether it was rationally connected to that aim, whether it was no more than necessary to achieve the aim, and whether a reasonable balance had been struck between the societal benefit and the interference with the protected right.

==== Double proportionality ====
Coleman considered that applying only a conventional single proportionality analysis could produce a one-sided analysis because the proceedings had been brought by an association representing journalists. Such framing risked treating press freedom as the primary right and neglecting the independently protected privacy rights of vehicle owners.

He therefore adopted the "double proportionality" approach discussed in authorities including Campbell v MGN Ltd and Re W (Children) (Identification: Restrictions on Publication) [2005] EWHC 1564 (Fam), and in an extra-judicial speech by Chief Justice Andrew Cheung. Under that approach, the proportionality test is applied to each competing fundamental right in turn so that neither obtains priority merely because of the identity of the litigant who brought the challenge.

Coleman noted that a sufficiently modified single proportionality test could in practice resolve a conflict between competing rights by giving adequate weight to the second right at the necessity and reasonable-balance stages. He nevertheless considered an express double analysis preferable in a complicated case because it reduced the risk that the framing of the proceedings would skew the analysis and supplied a more structured method of balancing the rights.

The starting point was therefore that the two rights had presumptive parity, that neither freedom of expression and the press nor privacy automatically took precedence over the other.

==== Freedom of expression and the press ====
The parties largely agreed that protecting vehicle owners' privacy and preventing misuse of personal information were legitimate aims. The dispute concerned rational connection, necessity and the eventual balance.

The HKJA argued that there was no rational basis for allowing specified categories of applicants to obtain information automatically while subjecting journalistic applicants to a substantially more onerous process. It also relied on the societal importance of investigative journalism and argued that the policy produced delay and a chilling effect, particularly because journalists' identities or information about their investigations might be disclosed to vehicle owners or government bodies consulted during the process.

The Commissioner argued that the written-submission requirement served as a filter against abuse and gave the Commissioner sufficient information to make an informed decision. The Commissioner also relied on risks including doxxing, naming-and-shaming, interference with law-enforcement investigations and speculative fishing for possible leads.

Coleman held that the additional Public Interest Route requirements were rationally connected to the legitimate aim of protecting vehicle owners' privacy. He further held that the requirements were no more than necessary. The policy was not a blanket refusal of journalistic applications; instead, it required additional detail before disclosure to a third party where the information could subsequently be disseminated widely. JURIST likewise reported that the court regarded the policy as allowing the Commissioner to assess the public interest in disclosure against the owner's privacy rather than excluding journalists altogether.

Coleman considered some additional processing time a natural and foreseeable result of the more detailed assessment rather than a delay imposed merely because an application was journalistic. He distinguished that systemic issue from whether the actual period of delay in an individual case might become excessive.

The court also accepted that disclosure of a journalist's identity could potentially disrupt an investigation. Coleman nevertheless held that investigative journalism did not confer blanket immunity from reciprocal effects upon a journalist's own privacy when the journalist was seeking another person's private information.

==== Vehicle owners' privacy ====
For the second proportionality analysis, Coleman reversed the perspective. The protected right was the vehicle owner's privacy, while the interference was the disclosure of information from the Register to third parties.

He identified the relevant legitimate aim, for the purposes of the dispute, as disclosure of relevant information for bona fide journalistic purposes. Disclosure was rationally connected to that aim because Choy Yuk Ling had recognised that journalistic purposes could properly justify applications for vehicle particulars.

The HKJA argued that vehicle owners had been informed that their particulars were held on a public register. Coleman rejected the proposition that this meant owners had consented to unrestricted disclosure. The provision of the information was effectively compulsory because a person wishing to register a vehicle was required to supply it.

Relying on authority concerning residential-address information, Coleman considered the loss of effective control over dissemination of personal information a substantial incursion into privacy, notwithstanding that some of the information might otherwise be obtainable in everyday life.

Coleman also considered the status of journalists themselves. He accepted that members of recognised journalistic organisations might be subject to professional standards reducing the risk of misuse of personal information. He nevertheless held that the title "journalist" could not itself confer special privilege because journalism is not a licensed profession in Hong Kong and there are no general educational, accreditation or registration requirements for practising journalism. JURIST highlighted this aspect of the reasoning in its report on the judgment.

Coleman added that an applicant who could demonstrate membership of an organisation such as the HKJA should nevertheless receive some weight in the Commissioner's assessment because such membership indicated that the applicant was subject to rules governing the collection and dissemination or publication of information.

==== Ultimate balance ====
Coleman described the ultimate balancing exercise as weighing the two fundamental rights and determining whether the protection afforded to one justified the interference with the other.

He held that the Public Interest Route did not impose an unacceptably harsh burden on journalists because it did not bar them from obtaining vehicle particulars. Journalists could still obtain disclosure where they satisfied the threshold imposed by the policy.

Conversely, Coleman considered that allowing journalists automatic access could impose an unacceptably harsh burden on vehicle owners by permitting disclosure of their personal information to unrelated third parties without an individual assessment of whether disclosure was justified.

The court therefore held that the restrictions imposed on journalistic applications were rationally connected to privacy protection, no more than necessary and did not impose an unacceptably harsh burden on press freedom. Applying the double proportionality analysis and the ultimate balancing exercise, Coleman dismissed the constitutional challenge.

A case note published by Des Voeux Chambers, whose members Jenkin Suen SC and Michael Lok had acted for the Commissioner in the proceedings, characterised double proportionality as a "major plank" of the reasoning. It highlighted the court's use of separate analyses of press freedom and privacy and its conclusion that the Public Interest Route did not impose an unacceptably harsh burden on journalists because it did not amount to a blanket refusal of journalistic applications.

=== Wednesbury unreasonableness ===
The HKJA separately argued that excluding journalistic applications from the Automatic Route amounted to irrational and unjustifiably inconsistent treatment, particularly because there was no evidence that people claiming journalistic purposes were more likely than automatic-route applicants to misuse personal information.

Coleman rejected the Wednesbury challenge. He emphasised the high threshold for irrationality and held that the policy did not seek to exclude journalism, since journalistic applications remained possible through the Public Interest Route. Closer consideration of applications falling outside the specified purposes was rational in light of the Commissioner's responsibility to protect vehicle owners' privacy.

By the time of judgment, one journalistic application had succeeded in obtaining the first-registration dates of 12 vehicles after the Commissioner concluded that the public interest in disclosure outweighed the vehicle owners' privacy. A later request for the full particulars of the same vehicles was refused.

Even applying closer scrutiny because fundamental rights were engaged, Coleman was not satisfied that the policy was irrational in the public-law sense.

=== Notification and fettering of discretion ===
The HKJA's fourth ground concerned the collection of applicants' personal information and its potential disclosure to registered vehicle owners, which the association characterised as a compulsory notification or "tip-off".

The HKJA argued that notification could alert the subject of a journalistic investigation and thereby interfere with the investigation or expose reporters to reprisals.

Coleman held that the notification system pursued the legitimate aim of protecting personal data by alerting vehicle owners to the disclosure of their information and enabling them to respond to possible misuse, abuse or leakage.

He accepted the general importance of enabling the press to investigate matters of public interest without fear of reprisal and of protecting journalistic confidentiality, but did not accept that notification of a vehicle owner necessarily created such a risk beyond the ordinary risks of journalistic inquiries.

Coleman concluded that a reasonable balance had been struck and that the notification arrangements did not constitute an unlawful fetter of the Commissioner's discretion.

=== Delays and individual refusals ===
The fifth ground concerned delays in six journalistic applications, including applications by HK01, Ming Pao, Now TV and The Collective, and the subsequent rejection of three of them.

Coleman accepted as a matter of principle that undue delay in administrative decision-making could amount to constructive refusal and that excessive delay might constitute procedural unfairness or irrationality. The reasonable time required for a decision depended upon the circumstances of the individual case.

The HKJA argued that news was a perishable commodity and that delays ranging from approximately three to six months were incompatible with effective journalism.

Coleman nevertheless concluded, with some hesitation, that the delays before him were not clearly unreasonable. He took into account the need for manual consideration, possible consultation with other departments, correspondence seeking further information, the age and urgency of some of the underlying investigations, and the fact that the applications had been made shortly after introduction of the new policy.

He accepted that the early operation of the system could have involved implementation problems and held that the delays did not cross the threshold required for a breach of natural justice or other public-law failure, while observing that the processing times were not commendable. RTHK's report on the judgment highlighted Coleman's later statement that the initial adjustment period should by then have ended and processing should become substantially faster.

The HKJA also challenged the substantive rejections on grounds including inadequate reasons, irrationality and failure properly to recognise the role of journalism.

Coleman held that judicial review was supervisory and that the court could not substitute its own assessment of the merits for that of the Commissioner. He found that the Commissioner had considered relevant matters including the purpose of each application, how the requested information would advance the claimed public interest, data-protection measures, possible alternative means of obtaining the information and potential prejudice to other persons or society.

He therefore held that neither the delays nor the challenged refusals were irrational or unconstitutional. Coleman nevertheless expressly recorded that there was no basis for finding or suggesting that any of the journalists involved had or would misuse the information they sought.

=== Result and postscript ===
Coleman dismissed the application for judicial review, holding that none of the five grounds had been made out. Costs were reserved.

He nevertheless stated that the erroneous description of the statutory purposes of the Register contained in the Guidance Notes and declaration forms should be corrected, although the error did not alter the outcome of the proceedings.

In a postscript, Coleman described the proceedings as a matter of public importance with significant implications for applicants seeking vehicle particulars for bona fide investigative journalism.

He stated that, by 2026, the initial implementation period that might have explained lengthy processing times should have ended and that applications should consequently be determined more quickly. Coleman considered that an application from a journalist with proper credentials and a cogently explained journalistic reason should ordinarily be capable of relatively prompt assessment and should not require a process lasting many weeks.

He further stated that freedom of the press operated primarily for the benefit of society as a whole rather than merely for individual journalists, and that this should be recognised with an appropriate degree of trust when applications under the Public Interest Route were assessed.

== Reception ==
The HKJA expressed disappointment with the judgment. It said that during the period relevant to the judicial review the government had received 17 applications for vehicle information for journalistic purposes, of which only one had resulted in a partial release after several months. The association maintained that the practical operation of the regime favoured vehicle owners' privacy and did not adequately facilitate bona fide investigative journalism. On 6 March 2026, the association said that it would study the judgment and consider whether to appeal.

The Hong Kong government welcomed the judgment. A government spokesperson said the arrangements struck a reasonable balance among the applicable fundamental rights and were intended to ensure that vehicle information was sought for lawful and legitimate purposes while protecting vehicle owners' personal privacy.

== See also ==
- Bao Choy
- Freedom of the press in Hong Kong
- Hong Kong Journalists Association
- Judicial review in Hong Kong
