= Hong Kong Connection =

News documentary program

- Genre: Current affairs documentary
- Country of origin: Hong Kong
- Original languages: Chinese; English

Production
- Producer: RTHK
- Running time: About 30 minutes (with advertising)

Original release
- Release: March 12, 1978 – present

Hong Kong Connection (Chinese: 鏗鏘集), formerly The Common Sense, is a long-running news documentary television programme produced by Hong Kong public broadcaster RTHK. It mainly covers Hong Kong politics, economics, education, disadvantaged, environmental protection, mainland China affairs, international affairs, etc. The programme premiered on 5 March 1978.

== History ==
=== Evolution of programs ===
At an early stage, Hong Kong Connection consisted mainly of drama components. After several reforms, the program turned into a documentary-like current events program.

In 2017, RTHK released a 60 episodes program in Chinese called The record of eras - Hong Kong Connection (The first episode and episode 51 are missing). The program reviewed the history of Hong Kong using the thousands of stories from Hong Kong Connection, which has launched for more than 30 years.

On 29 July 2019, Hong Kong Connection broadcast 721 Yuen Long Nightmare, introducing what happened in 2019 Yuen Long attack. In the program, Hong Kong Connection's reporters reconstructed the timeline of the attack through collecting the CCTV footage dated 21 July 2019. (video deleted, saved in Internet Archive) The video received more than 3 million views (Chinese version).

== Controversies ==
=== Arrest of journalist investigating 2019 Yuen Long attack ===
On 3 November 2020, the police arrested freelance journalist Choy Yuk-ling, who filmed a Hong Kong Connection episode about the 2019 Yuen Long attack. She was charged with misusing a government vehicle licensing database and making false statements to obtain information and records about car owners after trying to discover the owners of a few vehicles suspected of supplying weapons to the attackers who launched an indiscriminate attack on scores of people. The owners of cars were identified as rural village leaders. She checked a box to declare that the vehicle registration searches were for "other traffic and transport related matters". Other options available when accessing the database are "legal proceedings" and "sale and purchase of vehicle". While the previously available option "other purposes" had been scrapped, the magistrate said that Choy should have considered other means to obtain the information. The police dismissed allegations that the arrest was an attack on press freedom. Choy was found guilty on 22 April 2021 and fined HK$6,000. The Foreign Correspondents Club on 22 April strongly criticised the verdict as setting a "dangerous precedent" for "legal action against journalists for engaging in routine reporting".

=== Censorship ===
Following the 2019-2020 protests, the pro-Beijing camp and the government have attacked RTHK, accusing the station of bias. A new director of broadcasting, Patrick Li, took charge of RTHK in March 2021. The broadcaster has seen an exodus of senior staff, and censorship of RTHK documentaries has been on the rise. In May 2021, it was announced that old episodes of RTHK programmes would be deleted from the Internet, including old episodes of Hong Kong Connection.

In May 2021, it was reported that RTHK management had rejected proposed new episodes on the 2019 Yuen Long attack and Hong Kong commemorations of the 1989 Tiananmen Square protests and massacre. Paul Lee Yin-chit, who headed production of Hong Kong Connection, subsequently resigned from RTHK.

=== Deletion of online videos ===
On 3 May 2021, numerous videos on the RTHK YouTube and Facebook pages, including episodes of Hong Kong Connection, were deleted. The deleted videos were all uploaded more than a year ago, and included 721 Yuen Long Nightmare. A spokesperson for RTHK stated the measure aligned the policy of its social media platforms with its website, where only programmes from the past 12 months are viewable. However, the RTHK Programme Staff Union considered the videos as the common property of Hongkongers, criticising the removal of videos as 'unreasonable' and 'unnecessary'.

== Awards ==
- Asia-Pacific Broadcasting Union commendation, 1983 – for episode Nurses in Hongkong
- International Film and Television Festival of New York, Silver Medal, 1983 – for episode Vietnamese Refugees
- Human Rights Press Award, 2021 – for episode 7.21 Who Owns the Truth
