= Bao Choy =

Hong Kong journalist and television producer

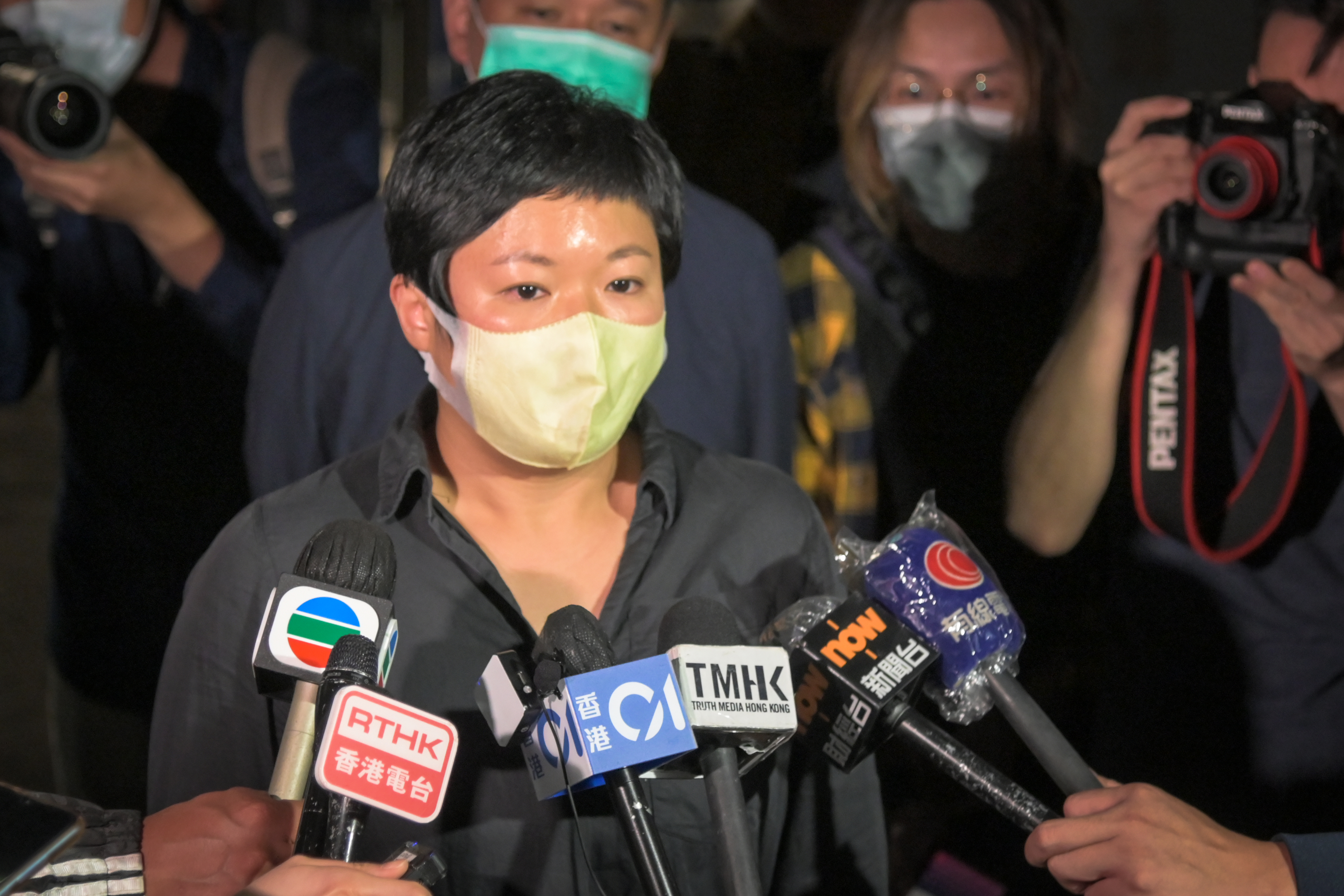
Choy in 2020

Choy Yuk-Ling (Chinese: 蔡玉玲), better known as Bao Choy, is a journalist and television producer in Hong Kong, best known for her work on and subsequent arrest for Radio Television Hong Kong (RTHK)'s Hong Kong Connection. In the making of the investigative documentary titled 7.21 Who Owns the Truth? for Hong Kong Connection, Choy requested and obtained publicly available vehicle registration records to identify suspects involved in the Yuen Long mob attack during the 2019–2020 Hong Kong protests. She was arrested in November 2020 for allegedly violating the Road Traffic Ordinance in Hong Kong for falsely declaring her intention to access the database and was found guilty and fined on two charges in April 2021. In June 2023 she won her appeal against the sentence, with the Court of Final Appeal annulling it.

== Career ==
Choy joined Radio Television Hong Kong (RTHK) in 2007 working on multiple TV programmes. In 2016, she joined the Hong Kong-based investigative news agency FactWire as a founding editorial member but returned to RTHK in 2018 as a freelance producer for Hong Kong Connection.

She was suspended from working at RTHK after her arrest in November 2020. In 2021, Choy was awarded membership in the Neiman Fellowship Class of 2022 at Harvard University.

== Arrest, sentencing and exoneration ==
In the making of 7.21 Who Owns the Truth?, an episode of RTHK's Hong Kong Connection documentary programme, Choy examined the 21 July 2019 Yuen Long mob attack where suspected gang members attacked citizens indiscriminately. Using CCTV footage, Choy and colleagues identified a few vehicles parked near the suspected gang members and issued a request to use the publicly available vehicle registration database to identify the car owners. The episode aired in July 2020, with narration stating that according to the database, the vehicles suspected of having transported weapons for the mobs were linked to local village representatives.

In early November 2020, Choy was arrested for allegedly misstating her intention to obtain vehicle licence plate information. Charged with two counts of making false statements under the Road Traffic Ordinance, Choy first appeared in court on November 10. She pleaded not guilty.

According to the Principal Magistrate, Ivy Chui, the Road Traffic Ordinance could only approve the public access to the database for reasons: transport or traffic-related matters, legal matters, or for vehicle purchases. Not given a category for journalistic reasons, Choy declared in her online application that her intention to obtain the vehicle registration records was for "transport or traffic-related matters." The charge was criticized by the Hong Kong Journalists Association who stated that checking publicly accessible databases, including vehicle registration records, has been a common investigative tool in Hong Kong. It was also argued by Choy's lawyer during trials that Choy's use of the database was indeed a "transport or traffic-related matter" since the vehicles were suspected of transporting weapons on the night of the mob attack.

Facing a maximum sentence of six months' imprisonment, on April 22, 2021, Choy was convicted by the West Kowloon Magistrates’ Courts and handed a HK$6,000 (around US$770) fine over the two charges.

In January 2023, the Court of Final Appeal allowed her appeal after it had been rejected in November 2022 by High Court judge Alex Lee. She was unanimously exonerated and had her sentence quashed by a panel of five judges on June 5, 2023. The panel said in a statement that there was no reason for "bona fide journalism" to be excluded from Choy's chosen option in the search application database.
