= Timeline of reactions to the 2020 Hong Kong national security law (September–November 2021) =

Timeline of the 2019–2020 Hong Kong protests
2019			March–June				July	August	September	October	November	December
2020	January	February	March	April	May	June	July	August	September	October	November	December
2021	January	February	March	April	May	June	July	August	September–November			December

Several more pro-democracy organizations dissolved under the pressure of the national security law. The Hong Kong Confederation of Trade Unions additionally cited physical threats that had been reported by members. The disbandment of the Hong Kong Alliance followed the arrest of its leadership under charges of collusion with foreign forces, adding to earlier arrests of its lead figures. Student Politicism also dissolved.

Secretary for Security Chris Tang accused the Hong Kong Journalists Association of failing to uphold professional standards among its members, and said it shared a responsibility for the eroding reputation of authorities among young people in Hong Kong since 2019. The association strongly denied the accusations.

In November, two activists were jailed under the national security law, one of them purely for speech-based crimes.

== September ==
=== 1 September ===
==== Protest humanitarian fund probed ====
Key leaders in charge of the 612 Humanitarian Relief Fund, which had been founded in 2019 in order to give financial aid to protesters facing prosecution or financial hardship, received letters from police demanding operational information pursuant to the national security law. The national security department investigated unspecified allegations of collusion with foreign forces. The 612 Humanitarian Relief Fund announced on September 6 that it would stop receiving donations "for the time being" after it had received advice from the Alliance for True Democracy that requests for payments out of the bank account of the fund would no longer be processed.

=== 2 September ===
==== Protest at women's prison ====
A response team and a dog unit of the Correctional Services Department were called in to help front line staff at the Lo Wu Correctional Institution to quash a protest of 18 inmates, reportedly including former district councillor Tiffany Yuen. The inmates had protested against disciplinary action that had been taken against six other prisoners who had been found in possession of prohibited articles during a surprise search.

=== 9 September ===
==== Hong Kong Alliance crackdown under National Security Law ====
Leaders of the Hong Kong Alliance in Support of Patriotic Democratic Movements of China, Lee Cheuk-yan, Albert Ho and Chow Hang-tung were charged, along with the Alliance itself, with "incitement to subversion", a crime under the national security law. All three were already arrested at that time; Chow had been arrested for denying a police data request regarding the Alliance days earlier. National Security police also froze 2.2 million Hong Kong dollars in assets of the Alliance.

=== 14 September ===
==== Security Secretary Tang lashes out at journalist association ====
In an interview with Ta Kung Pao, Secretary for Security Chris Tang said that fake news, bogus reporters and independent media outlets had caused hatred of authorities among youths since the protests in 2019. He also accused the Hong Kong Journalists Association of violating professional ethics through advocating a sense of "everyone can be a journalist". Association chairman Ronson Chan took issue with Tang's statement that the Association had "positions filled by many student journalists", which he called "factually wrong" as only 13 per cent of the executive committee were students. He also said that while "everyone can be a journalist" was not something the Association advocated, it was a concept safeguarded under the Basic Law.

=== 18 September ===
==== Hong Kong Confederation of Trade Unions to disband ====
At a news conference, the Hong Kong Confederation of Trade Unions (HKCTU) announced that it would disband. It had passed a motion to that effect the previous week. Co-president Joe Wong said: "We want to apologise to the people of Hong Kong that we cannot continue." He added that in recent days, messages to several members had made them fear for their physical safety. Wong denied claims by pro-Beijing media that the HKCTU was an agent for foreign entities and thus potentially violating the national security law; projects with the Solidarity Center in the United States had not involved any political activities, and stopped before the national security law came into force. Prior to the news conference, chief executive Mung Siu Tat announced on Facebook that he had resigned and left Hong Kong "based on safety considerations".

=== 20 September ===
==== Student Politicism members arrested ====
Police arrested three members of pro-democracy student group Student Politicism for allegedly "inciting subversion", a crime under the Hong Kong national security law. The three arrestees, two males and one female, were aged between 18 and 20 years. In a raid of a warehouse of the group in Kwai Chung, sweets, surgical masks, biscuits, lotion, and books were confiscated. These had been intended by the group to be sent to prisoners in the city, and were on a list of permissible goods they could receive; Senior Superintendent Steve Li suggested that the intention of democracy activists had been to win over followers in prison, saying that "If the intention is to help prisoners with the same beliefs and to recruit followers (...) to continue to violate national security, it is a problem for sure." He also said that the group had used illegal slogans and told people to "prepare for the next revolution".

=== 21 September ===
==== Fourth Student Politicism member arrested, bail denied to three others ====
A fourth member of Student Politicism, 19-year-old spokeswoman Wong Yuen-lam was arrested in Mong Kok after she had turned herself in. The three others who had been arrested the day before appeared in West Kowloon Court, where they were denied bail. Their next appearance in court was scheduled for November 3.

=== 23 September ===
==== Bail denied to fourth Student Politicism member ====
Student Politicism spokeswoman Wong, who besides an incitement to subversion charge – as the three other arrested students – had additionally been charged with inciting others to "overthrow the body of central power of the People’s Republic of China or the body of power of the Hong Kong Special Administrative Region", was denied bail at West Kowloon Court. The prosecution applied to adjourn the case to November 3.

=== 25 September ===
==== Hong Kong Alliance dissolved ====
At a special meeting, the Hong Kong Alliance in Support of Patriotic Democratic Movements of China decided to disband, with 41 members voting in favour and four against. Afterwards, Company Secretary of the Alliance Richard Tsoi told the press that he believed that "Hong Kong people, no matter in [an] individual capacity or other capacities, will continue commemorating June 4th as before."

=== 28 September ===
==== Student Politicism disbanded ====
Pro-democracy student group Student Politicism disbanded, as it had announced on September 24, following the recent arrest of four of its leaders. As reason for the decision, the organization said on Facebook that there was a "lack of foreseeable space for our organisation to continue our mission".

== October ==
=== 3 October ===
==== Hong Kong Confederation of Trade Unions dissolved ====
Members of the Hong Kong Confederation of Trade Unions voted to disband, as had been foreshadowed in September. Vice-chairman Leo Tang cited "political uncertainty" as a reason, declining to elaborate further.

=== 4 October ===
==== Water barriers removed ====
Water barriers deployed at the headquarters of the Central Government Complex during the anti-government protests were removed. The previous day, barriers deployed outside the Legislative Council had been removed, but a police presence was maintained in the vicinity. Chief Secretary for Administration John Lee said on his blog that the removals symbolized the restoration of order in the city.

=== 7 October ===
==== CUHK Student Union dissolved ====
The student union at the Chinese University of Hong Kong announced its decision to disband, citing its difficulties to reconcile legal advice with university management instructions. Observers saw the dissolution as a further sign of the pressure from authorities on university campuses.

=== 8 October ===
==== Pillar of Shame at University of Hong Kong removal plans ====
The Hong Kong Alliance, which had disbanded in September, and its liquidators received a letter dated 7 October from the University of Hong Kong (HKU) which requested the removal of the Pillar of Shame from campus by 13 October. The letter stated that the university would consider the statue abandoned and subject to action by the university "in such manner as it thinks fit without further notice" if it had not been removed by then. The creator of the statue, Jens Galschiøt, said he was "shocked" about the decision, about which he had not been informed prior to the media reports. Describing itself as the owner of the statue, he said he would take the university "to court if they destroy it".

Authorities removed the statue in the early hours of 23 December. The HKU Council said in a statement that the removal "was based on external legal advice and risk assessment for the best interest of the university".

=== 25 October ===
==== Amnesty International withdraws from Hong Kong ====
In a press release, human rights NGO Amnesty International announced that its Hong Kong membership section would cease its operations, while its regional office would be moved to elsewhere in the region. Board chair Anjhula Mya Singh Bais said in the announcement that the decision had been "driven by Hong Kong’s national security law, which has made it effectively impossible for human rights organizations in Hong Kong to work freely and without fear of serious reprisals from the government".

=== 27 October ===
==== Film Censorship law amendment passed ====
The Legislative Council passed a new law banning films deemed to violate national security interests, with punishment for violation including up to three years imprisonment and fines of up to 1 million Hong Kong dollars. It gave the Chief Secretary the power to revoke a film's license. The bill did not cover films posted online.

Experts and filmmakers raised concerns that the legislation would stifle the film industry in the city. Filmmaker Kiwi Chow said that the law would "worsen self-censorship and fuel fear among filmmakers", while Kenny Ng from the Academy of Film at Hong Kong Baptist University said that the addition of national security clauses to the bill was "clear political censorship", and that the industry would need "time to adapt". Councillor and law professor Priscilla Leung insisted that the bill was in full compliance with human rights laws.

== November ==
=== 1 November ===
==== Four people arrested over banner calling for democracy ====
Four seniors were arrested on Sai Yeung Choi Street South in the evening and detained for further investigation. Local media reported that the group had displayed a yellow banner displaying the words "I want genuine universal suffrage", the central slogan of the 2014 Umbrella Movement. Vigils by older pro-democracy activists had been held regularly in the same street since 2014.

=== 5 November ===
==== Local media outlet announces shutting down its operations ====
Taiwan-based online media outlet DB Channel, which had been founded during the 2019 protests, announced plans to shut down operations in Hong Kong after "weighing the risks", while maintaining its operations abroad. The move came after Frankie Fung, one of its co-founders who had been arrested in January as part of a major police action against pro-democracy activists involved in the 2020 Hong Kong pro-democracy primaries, was denied bail on 4 November. Another co-founder, Nilk Wu, told Hong Kong Free Press that DB Channel had not been able to access its bank accounts since November 2020.

=== 8 November ===
==== Secretary for Security issues warnings against inciting protest votes ====
As the December 2021 Hong Kong legislative election was drawing closer, Secretary for Security Chris Tang warned in a blog post against asking people not to vote or to cast an invalid ballot. He described such behavior as not only being in breach of the Elections (Corrupt and Illegal Conduct) Ordinance, but also a possible violation of the National Security Law. He singled out Ted Hui, who had recently called on voters to register a blank or void ballot. Tang lambasted Hui for "despicably inciting citizens to break the law".

=== 11 November ===
==== 'Captain America 2.0' sentenced to jail ====
Ma Chun-man, a Hong Kong activist dubbed "Captain America 2.0" in reference to the superhero whose shield he wielded at pro-democracy rallies, was sentenced to nearly six years in jail after having been found guilty in October of inciting secession. His was the second conviction under the national security law, after that of Tong Ying-kit in July. Ma had not pleaded guilty and in a letter to the judge did not express regret. After a successful appeal by Ma, his sentence was reduced on 3 August 2022 to five years.

=== 18 November ===
==== Chickeeduck plans to move its operations from Hong Kong ====
Clothing store chain Chickeeduck sold shirts bearing humorized versions of slogans from the 2019–2020 Hong Kong protests, and later gained popularity among democracy activists for not bowing to pressure by a landlord to remove a statue of a protester in full gear on one of its premises. The chain announced that it would shut its stores by the end of 2022, citing the reluctance of landlords to renew leases, as well as complaints which had led several government departments to investigate the chain. Owner Herbert Chow said that the firm planned to continue as a "brand for Hong Kongers" after exiting the Hong Kong market, without elaborating.

=== 23 November ===
==== Pro-independence activist Tony Chung sentenced to jail ====
Pro-independence activist Tony Chung was sentenced to three years and seven months in prison, at 20 years of age becoming the youngest person to be convicted under the national security law. Earlier that month, Chung, who had been in jail since October 2020, had, as part of a guilty plea, admitted guilt to a charge of secession and one count of money laundering, and pleaded not guilty to a sedition charge and another money laundering accusation.

=== 29 November ===
==== ICAC issues warrant against two pan-democrats in exile ====
The Independent Commission Against Corruption (ICAC) issued arrest warrants against former Legislative Council member Ted Hui, and former district councillor Yau Man-chun, on charges of advocating for others to boycott or cast blank votes in the legislative election on 19 December. Hui and Yau, who had self-exiled to Australia and the United Kingdom respectively, had made posts on Facebook which respectively called for casting blank or invalid votes, and for a boycott of what Yau described as "fake election". By 16 December, a total of ten people had been arrested for allegedly inciting others to skip the vote or cast blank ballots.
