= Timeline of reactions to the 2020 Hong Kong national security law (August 2021) =

Timeline of the 2019–2020 Hong Kong protests
2019			March–June				July	August	September	October	November	December
2020	January	February	March	April	May	June	July	August	September	October	November	December
2021	January	February	March	April	May	June	July	August	September–November			December

Two organizations considered to have been central to Hong Kong civil society, the Hong Kong Professional Teachers' Union and the Civil Human Rights Front (CHRF), disbanded this month. Both cited an inability to go forward in the changed atmosphere in the city created by the national security law. Chief Executive Carrie Lam dismissed concerns that the disbandment of the CHRF heralded a loss of freedom in the city, saying that many of the city's civil groups and individuals had "wilfully touched these red lines in the past", and that freedoms enshrined in the Hong Kong Basic Law may have to give way to goals such as national security, public hygiene (an apparent reference to the COVID-19 pandemic), or public morals.

== 10 August ==
=== Hong Kong Professional Teachers' Union dissolved ===
The Hong Kong Professional Teachers' Union (PTU), the city's largest teachers' union with over 95,000 members and over 200 full-time staff, announced its disbandment following a unanimous recommendation at an executive council meeting the night before. The step, which had been preceded by a fortnight of pressure that began with articles in Chinese state run media and continued with the Education Bureau severing its ties with the union, was seen by observers as another sign of the pressure on civil society groups through the national security law which had already led several organizations to cease operations. The Education Bureau accused the union of encouraging students and teachers to take part in "unlawful activities". The union said that it had not incited students to join demonstrations.

John Burns, an emeritus professor at the Department of Politics and Public Administration at the University of Hong Kong, suggested that the reason for the government to have cut ties with the union on 2 August – hours after the union had come under attack by mainland state media – may have been to reduce its influence in upcoming subsector elections relevant to the 2021 Hong Kong legislative election. Pro-establishment unions could "take over the positions that previously the PTU seemed to fill", he said.

== 15 August ==
=== Civil Human Rights Front disbanded ===
Civil Human Rights Front (CHRF), which had organized some of the biggest 2019-2020 Hong Kong protests, announced in a statement that it had "no choice but to disband", as no successor to arrested leader Figo Chan had been willing to step in. The statement called the government's rejection of its and other organizations' applications for rallies on the grounds of the coronavirus pandemic a "pretext". Prior to the dissolution, police had alleged that the CHRF had broken the law through not having been properly registered as on organization. Police acknowledged the dissolution but said that it would not absolve the group of any potential criminal liability.

== 16 August ==
=== Five sentenced for role in 2019 city-wide strikes ===
During the general strike on 5 August 2019, five people were charged with blacking out traffic lights in Tsuen Wan. They pleaded guilty to criminal damage and other crimes. They were sentenced in West Kowloon Magistrates' Court. Magistrate Colin Wong sent a severe sentence on the grounds that everyone in the case was holding radios and causing damage on a large scale. The first, third to fifth defendants were charged with criminal damage and were sentenced to 4 months' imprisonment; the second defendant was sentenced to a training center. He was also sentenced to a fine for failing to show his ID card. The other five were sentenced to compensation for cleaning fees.

== 18 August ==
=== Four HKU students arrested on charges of advocating terrorism ===
Four students of the University of Hong Kong (HKU) were arrested over a motion of the HKU student union passed on 7 July that had praised the attacker of the 1 July police stabbing for his "sacrifice". The four were charged with the national security crime of "advocating terrorism". Police said that they had found evidence that the four had spoken at the 7 July meeting. All four were denied bail the following day, and their case was adjourned to 14 September.

== 24 August ==
=== Film Censorship law to be amended ===
Secretary of Commerce Edward Yau told reporters that new film censorship legislation would be using the national security law as "main reference". In addition, the chief secretary would be empowered to revoke a film's license for national security concerns. The bill was to be put before the Legislative Council on 1 September. The move was preceded by several cancellations of protest-related films and documentaries.

== 26 August ==
=== Cheng Chung-tai disqualified ===
Chief Secretary John Lee, in his role as chair of the candidate qualification review committee that had been created as part of the 2021 Hong Kong electoral changes, announced the disqualification of Civic Passion politician Cheng Chung-tai from the upcoming 2021 Hong Kong legislative election. Earlier on, the National Security Committee had said that Cheng did qualify the allegiance pledge, with Lee saying that the decision had taken into account previous public statements, books, articles and conduct by Lee deemed to have been in breach of the pledge. The ousting took immediate effect, leaving the Legislative Council with only one member not aligned with the government.
