= Timeline of the 2019–2020 Hong Kong protests (July 2019) =

July events of the 2019–2020 pro-democracy demonstrations in Hong Kong

Timeline of the 2019–2020 Hong Kong protests
2019			March–June				July	August	September	October	November	December
2020	January	February	March	April	May	June	July	August	September	October	November	December
2021	January	February	March	April	May	June	July	August	September–November			December

This segment of the timeline of the 2019–2020 Hong Kong protests covers the month of July 2019. The anniversary of the 1997 handover of Hong Kong to China on 1 July saw large daytime protests. In the evening of that day, protesters stormed the Legislative Council Building and defaced symbols, with police only moving in after midnight. This incident, which was sharply condemned by the government of Carrie Lam, did however not lead to a split between peaceful and violent protesters. Observers linked the understanding of the non-violent protesters for the violent wing to the lack of willingness of the Lam government to engage in dialogue about the protesters' five demands. Apart from major protests on Sundays, there were also mostly peaceful demonstrations during the week.

A pattern became established such that peaceful daytime protests were followed by violent clashes between protesters and police at night. Police continued to draw criticism for its heavy-handed tactics.

A further landmark event in the evolution of the protests was the Yuen Long attack on 21 July. White-shirted gangs descended on Yuen Long station and wrought havoc in chaotic scenes, with a vast number of calls of citizens to police being unanswered until the attackers had retreated. This led to a further loss of faith of protesters and their sympathisers in the integrity of the police force, and also further worsened their views of the Hong Kong government. The government and representatives of the force would change their framing of the attack several times over the course of the following year.

== Events ==
=== 1 July protests ===
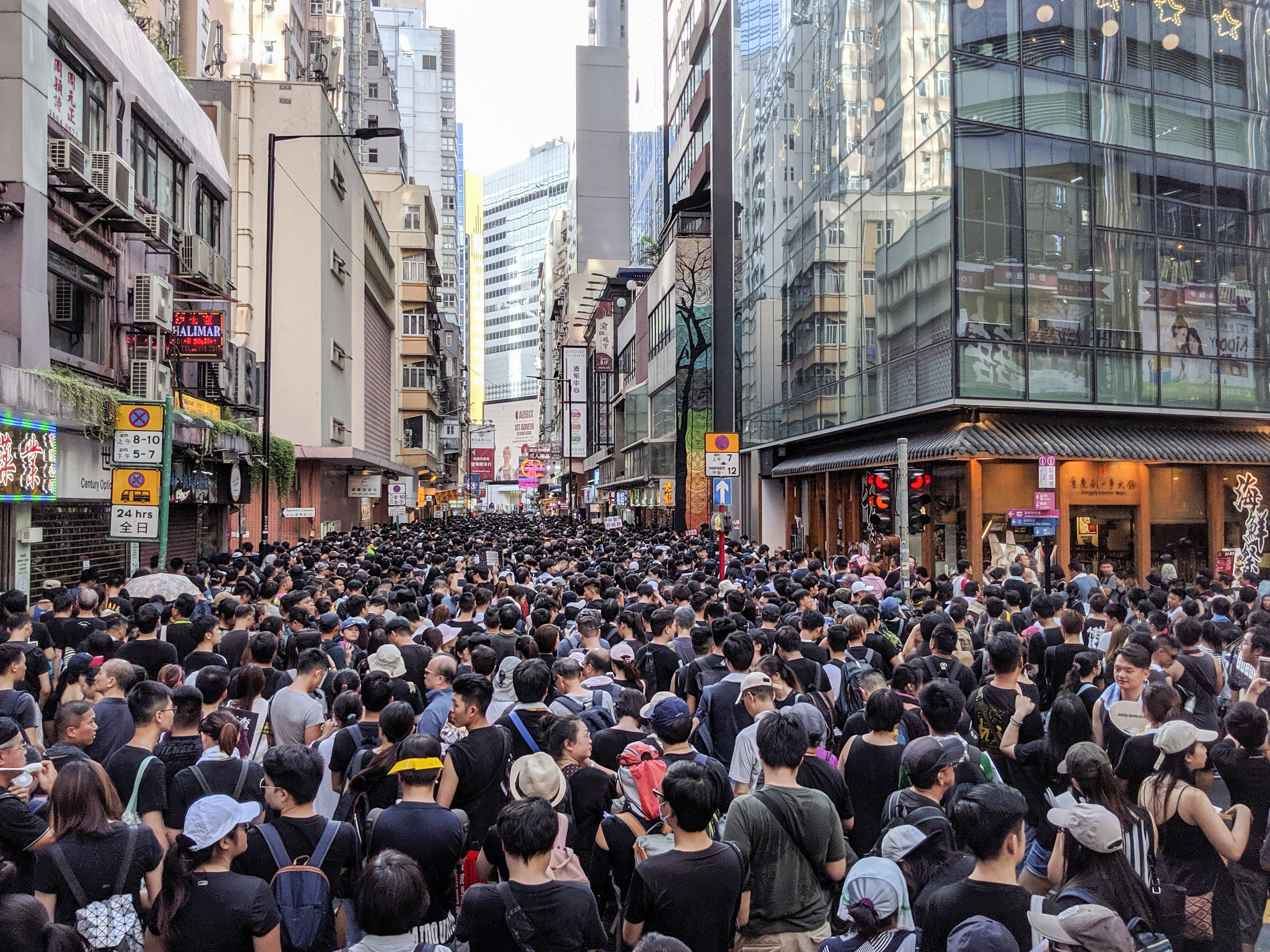
The annual 1 July march at the Jardine's Bazaar shopping district.

As the city marked the 22nd anniversary of its 1997 handover to China, the annual pro-democracy protest march organised by CHRF claimed a record turnout of 550,000 while police placed the estimate around 190,000; independent organisations using scientific methods calculated that participation was in the region of 250,000 people.

Early in the morning, Devil's Peak saw a white vertical protest banner with words roughly translated into "Mourning in Pain" (「痛心疾首」).

Later in the morning, the annual flag-raising ceremony outside the Hong Kong Convention and Exhibition Centre was disrupted by some 200 protesters who had followed online calls. They hurled eggs, water bottles and other objects at police; some shined laser pointers at them or hit them with umbrellas.

Before the march, youths had begun besieging the Legislative Council building. The march was later diverted to Chater Road in Central due to the people amassed in front of the Legislative Council.

At around 9:00 pm, hundreds of protesters stormed the legislature after breaking through the glass walls and metal doors of the building. Protesters caused extensive damage by ransacking the premises, damaging portraits of former pro-Beijing presidents of the Legislative Council, and smashing furniture. Protesters spray-painted slogans, hung up signs and erected barricades. During the occupation, 25-year-old student Brian Leung Kai-ping presented a new 10-point manifesto calling for greater freedom and democracy, and increased autonomy from Beijing.

The police started using tear gas to disperse protesters around the LegCo at 12:05 am, and reached the building 15 minutes later.

Carrie Lam's passive behavior in the preceding weeks and a "lack of positive response to the public", as put by Fernando Cheung, on the part of the government were cited as reasons for the occupation and the acts of property damage; the deaths from suicide also sparked anger and desperation among the protesters. During Carrie Lam's press conference at 4:00 am the following day, she acknowledged the peaceful and orderly march but strongly condemned the "violence and vandalism in the storming of the Legislative Council building". Lam evaded questions regarding recent deaths. The Hong Kong Journalists Association criticised the government for omitting the unanswered questions from the official transcript, while the Information Services Department responded that the transcript released was not a "verbatim".

After the protest, demonstrators and legislators condemned the Hong Kong police for deliberately allowing protesters to ram the glass doors and windows of the LegCo in front of cameras and television crews for hours, without any arrests or clearance. The police explained that their decision to retreat was after "considering a number of factors." By early 5 July, there had been at least 66 arrests and first formal charges laid in connection with the incident. On 13 April 2023, four defendants were sentenced for rioting at the flag-raising ceremony to between 26 and 28 months in prison. Of a group of four men who had been charged with rioting, two were sentenced to jail terms of three years, and two others to a training centre for a minimum of six months. The jail terms included a reduction by three months for the long delay, over two years of which were due to legal advice given by the Department of Justice to the prosecution.

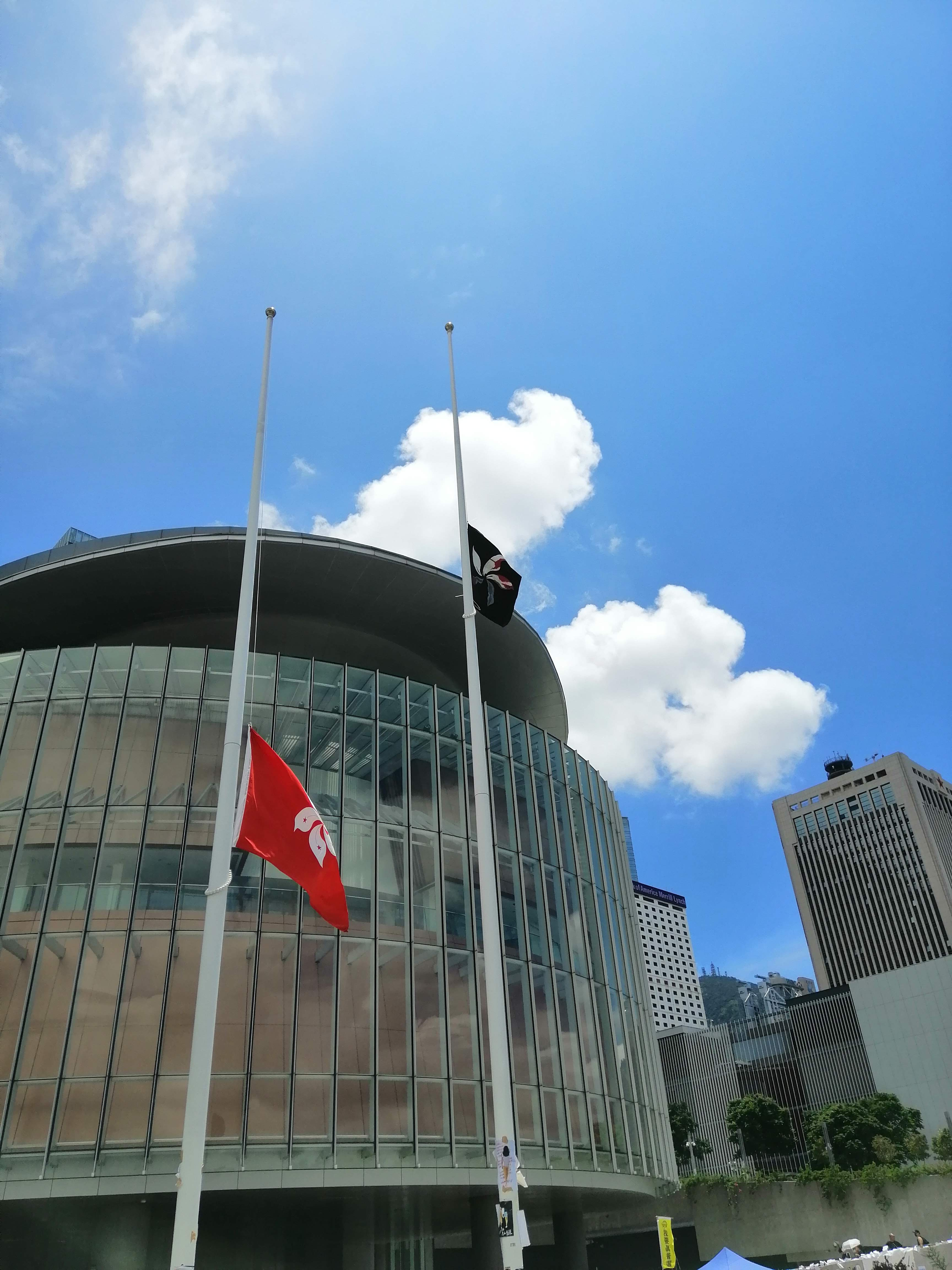
The "Black Bauhinia" flag hung by the protesters, flying at LegCo Building

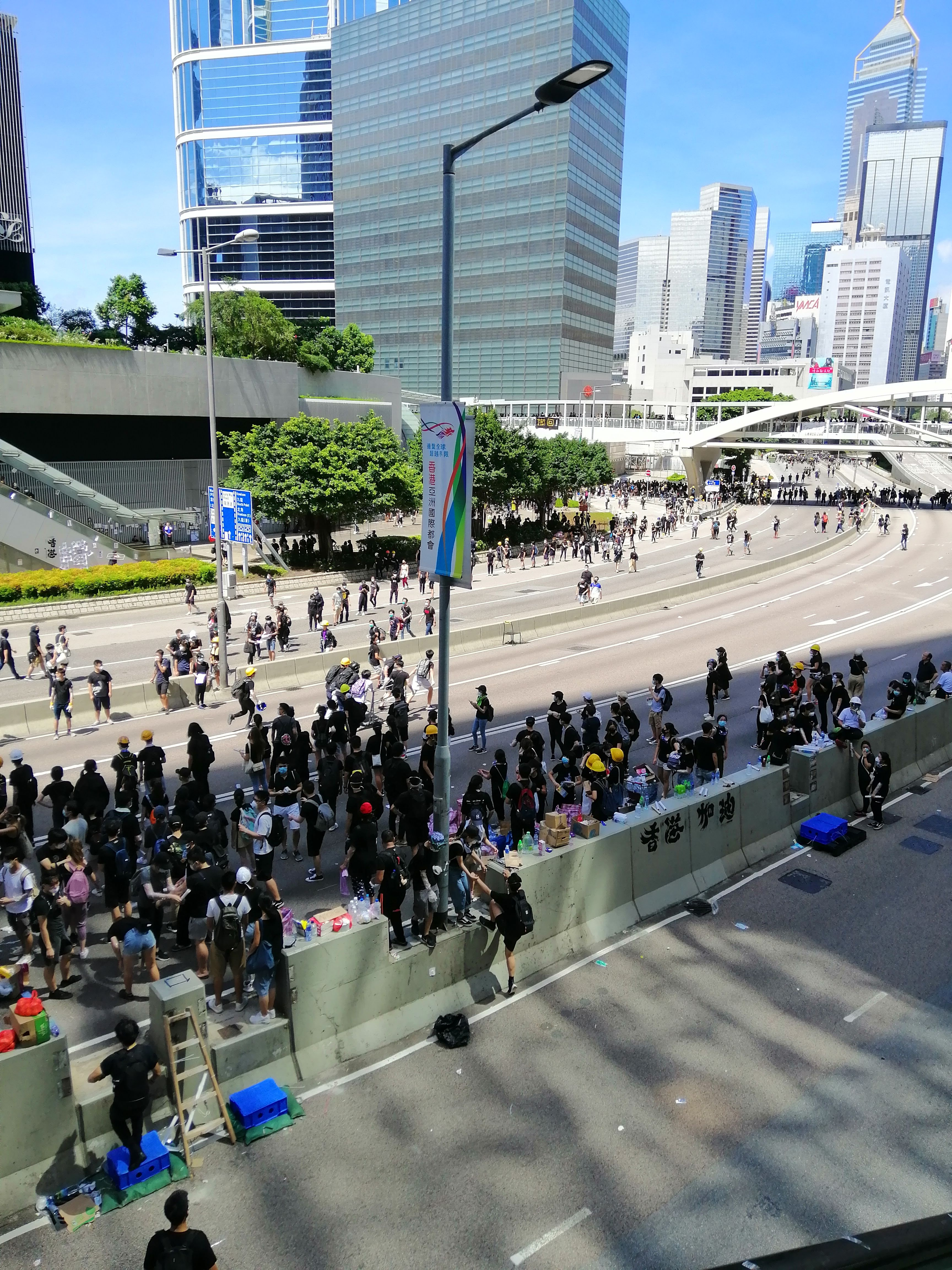
Protesters occupying Harcourt Road during the afternoon

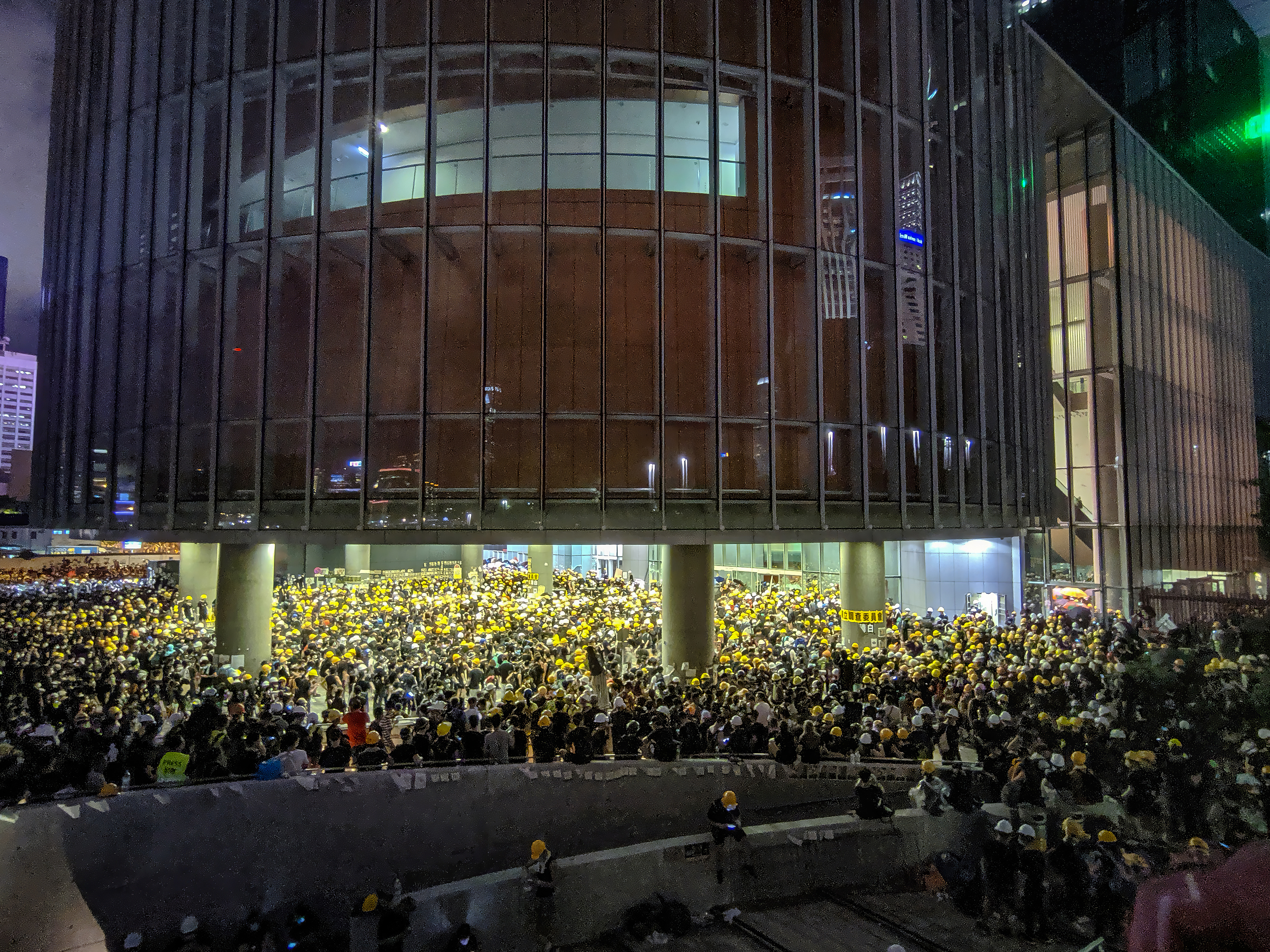
Hundreds of protesters near LegCo Building wearing protective helmets at night

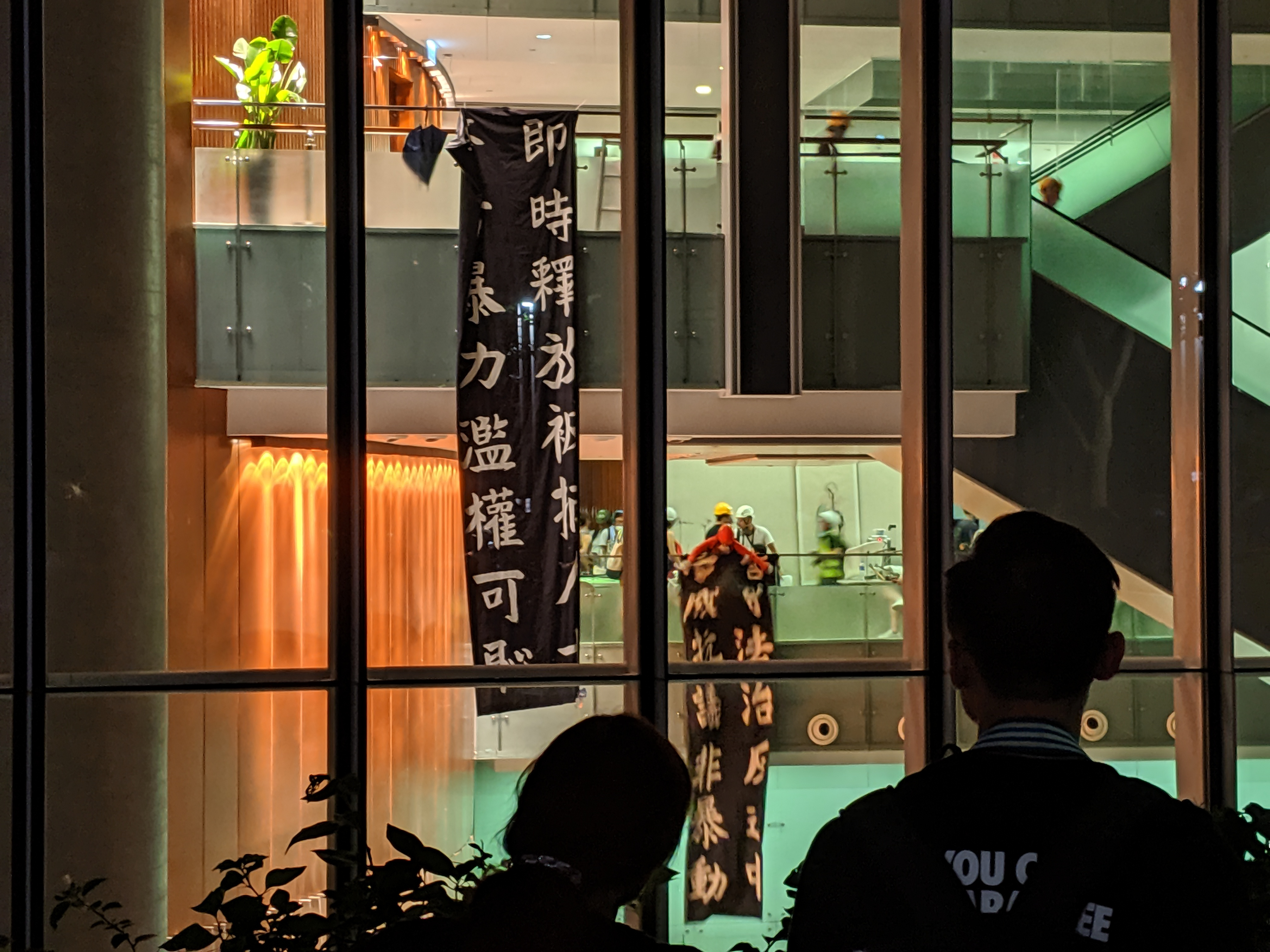
Protesters inside the LegCo Building at night

The situation of the Conference Room in LegCo after the protesters left

=== 5 July mothers' sit-in ===
On Friday evening, a second mother's rally occurred at Chater Garden in Central. According to organisers, about 8,000 were in attendance, while police cited 1,300 in attendance. The gathering of mothers and allies shared solidarity with young protesters and condemned the government for being indifferent to Hong Kong people's demands.

=== 6 July Reclaim Tuen Mun Park ===
On 6 July, people marched in a protest organised by the Tuen Mun Park Sanitation Concern Group. The protest aimed at condemning mainland Chinese middle-aged women singers and dancers, also known by the nickname "dai ma" (大媽), which literally translates to "big mothers," and the elderly men who gave these women "donations" for the noise disturbance and annoyances they have caused in Tuen Mun Park. Conflicts between the police and the protesters brew as the police escorted a person who allegedly assaulted the marchers away while using pepper spray on the protesters. The organiser claimed that nearly 10,000 people attended the protest.

=== 7 July Tsim Sha Tsui march ===
==== Daytime rally ====
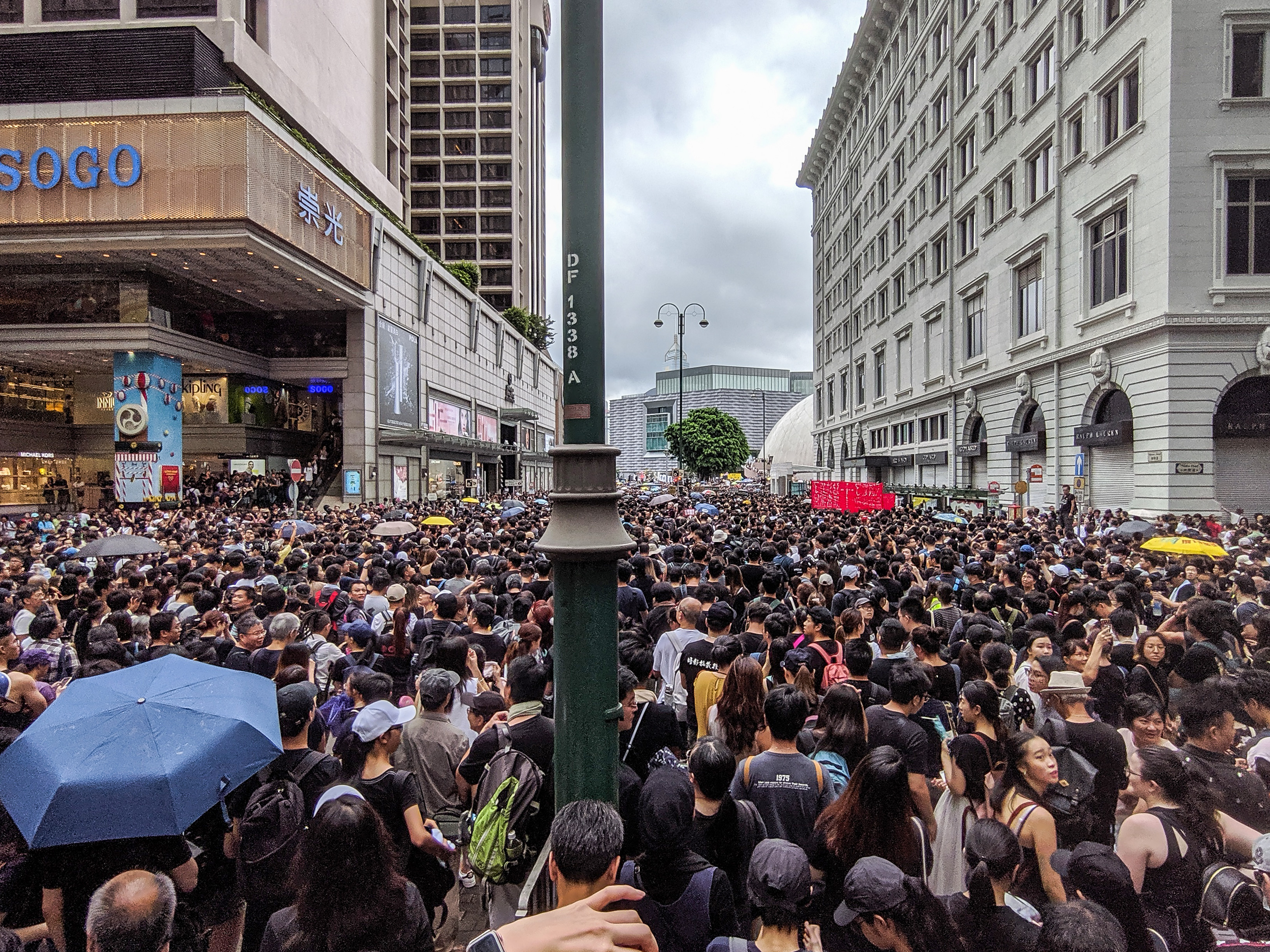
Tens of thousands of protesters in Nathan Road on 7 July.

The first anti-extradition bill protest in the Kowloon side of Hong Kong was held on 7 July in Tsim Sha Tsui. Before the march, organisers had promised that it would be a peaceful rally.

The rally started from Salisbury Garden at 3:30 pm, heading to the West Kowloon MTR station. The march ended at around 7 pm. The march was then officially called to an end at 7:30 pm. The organisers claimed more than 230,000 attended the march, while police estimated around 56,000 only.

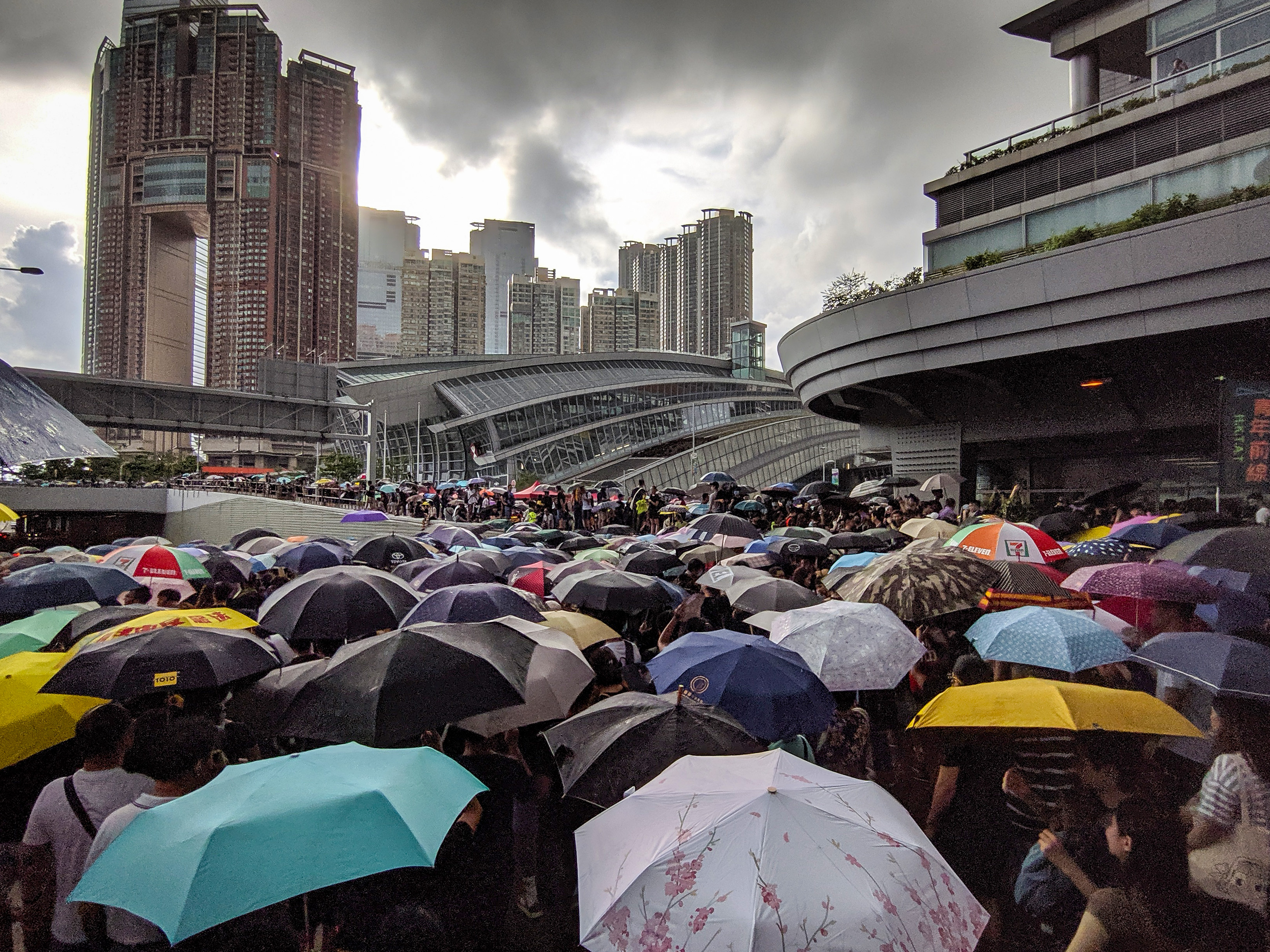
Protesters arriving at the destination of the march, the West Kowloon station.

Protesters marched along Nathan Road and Canton Road, which mainland tourists frequent because of the presence of a long string of luxury stores. The protest was aimed at giving a good impression to these visitors, hoping to raise their awareness of the issues and support for their cause. Hard copy booklets about the extradition bill in Simplified Chinese were distributed to mainland tourists, to bypass mainland web censorship. About 200 protestors assembled near the ferry terminal by the China Hong Kong City Centre, chanting in Mandarin and urging the shoppers to join the demonstration.

As a precaution, water barricades had been also set up by the police, with checkpoints to confirm the passengers' identities; the MTR Corporation had stopped selling tickets for journeys during noon-time. Protesters and residents condemned the action, complaining it unnecessary and unreasonable. This was the largest protest in Hong Kong solely mobilised by netizens and in Kowloon area to date.

==== Night-time clashes ====
After the end of the march at 7:30 pm, around 300 protesters left the West Kowloon station and headed to Canton Road again. They proceeded up Nathan Road and arrived at Mong Kok to find police amassed on Shantung Street, where there was a stand-off for around 20 minutes. Riot police, most of them refusing to exhibit an identification number or warrant card arrived, assaulting protestors and journalists alike. By the end of the night, at least six arrests were made. The following day, lawmaker Lam Cheuk-ting requested an independent investigation of police conduct, called for a review of video that may show the use of excessive force, and stated that failure to have warrant cards visibly displayed may be a violation of the law.

==== 10 July subsequent protests ====
On 10 July, two rival protests were held outside Wan Chai Police Headquarters. Around a dozen protesters from the pro-democracy Labour Party called on the police to launch a criminal investigation. The protesters presented as evidence five pieces of video footage purportedly showing officers assaulting demonstrators even after they had been pinned down. However, they were referred to the force's internal investigation unit – the Complaints Against Police Office. Around a dozen protesters from the pro-establishment Anti-black money, anti-Hong Kong independence concern group filed a police report claiming that pro-democracy lawmakers: Jeremy Tam, Au Nok-hin and Roy Kwong were involved in the violent night clashes.

=== 10 July Yau Tong's Lennon Wall tension ===
On 10 July, a few youngsters constructed a makeshift Lennon Wall on a pillar outside the Yau Tong MTR exit. They were soon surrounded and intimidated by tens of mostly middle-aged pro-government residents who were suspected of being off-duty policemen from nearby Yau Mei Court, which contains a "disciplined staff quarters" for police.

The crowds built up at night, growing into the hundreds. Numerous scuffles then broke out between a hundred pro-government residents and a much larger crowd protecting the youngsters. Hundreds of police arrived and formed a defence line on the staircase leading from the MTR exit. They were accused of not stopping the violence of the pro-government residents against the youngsters. The conflict persisted for hours and did not subside until 1 a.m. on 11 July. At least three arrests were made, including two retired police officers for common assault.

=== 13 July Reclaim Sheung Shui ===
On 13 July, a protest was organised in Sheung Shui for opposing mainland Chinese parallel trading, with 30,000 attendees claimed by the organiser. It was largely peaceful for the first two hours.

However, as it went on, the organiser and protesters refused to follow the authorised route, which had Sheung Shui station as the destination. Instead, they marched on Sheung Shui Plaza, occupied some roads and started clashing with the police who accused them of unlawful assembly, triggering an hours-long standoff which lasted until late night. Hong Kong press watchdogs later complained about police having jostled a handful of journalists.

During the skirmishes, a number of dispensaries were vandalised by the protesters because they were thought to be complicit in the mainland Chinese parallel trading. After the riot police resumed traffic by dispersing the crowd, they chased the crowd onto a footbridge leading to Sheung Shui station, when a young man suddenly attempted to jump off the footbridge for escape, but was hindered by police from jumping. He was arrested on suspicion of illegal assembly. Legislator Andrew Wan was also hit by a police baton.

=== 14 July Journalists' silent march ===
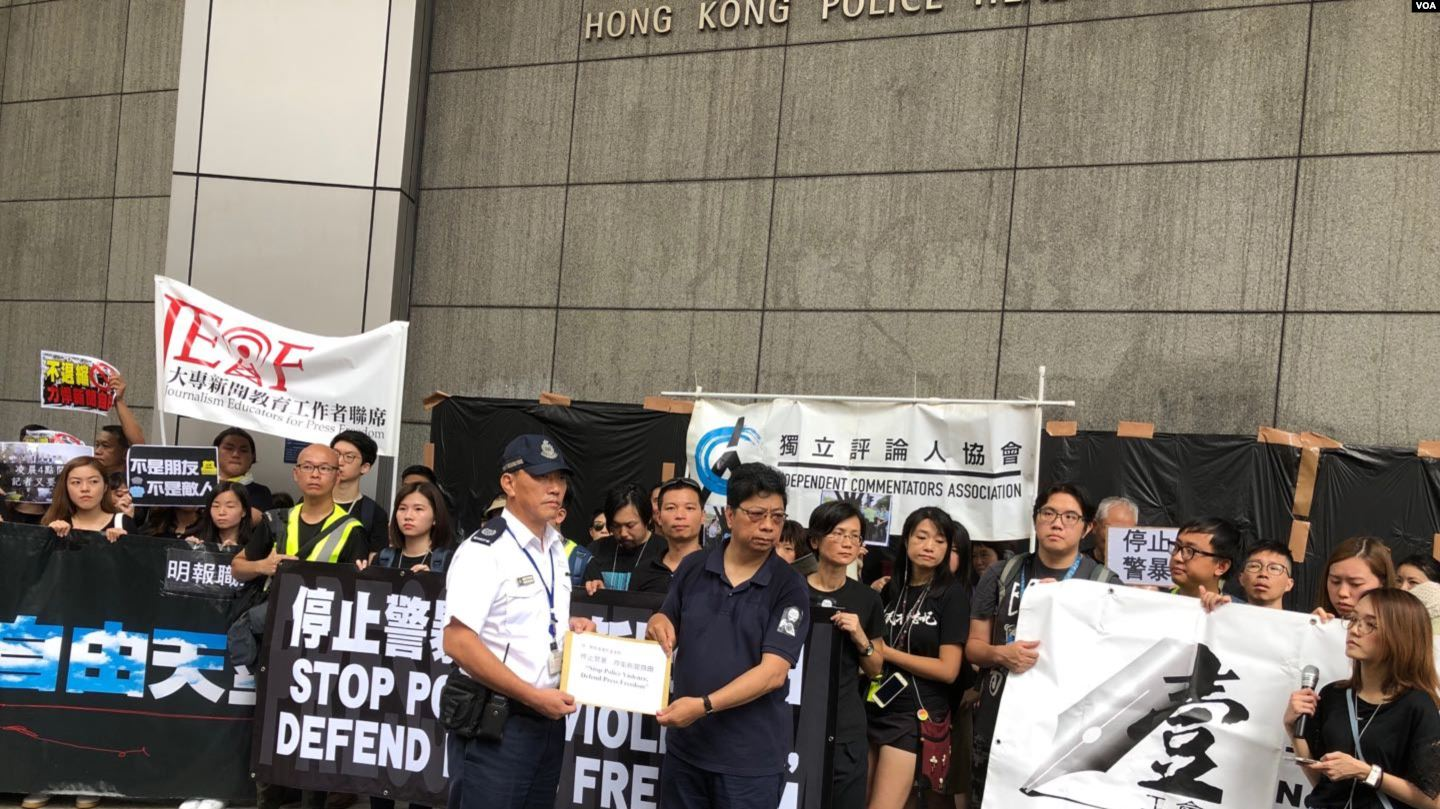
Protester handing their complaint letter to police representative on 14 July.

On 14 July, at 10:30 am, journalists and others in the media industry held a silent march from Harcourt Garden in Admiralty to Police Headquarters in Wan Chai; then on to the Chief Executive Office to protest against police attacks on the press. Journalists at the front of the march held a large banner that read "Stop Police Violence, Defend Press Freedom." They called on the Chief Executive to defend press freedom and enforce the Pledge to Uphold Press Freedom decree, which she signed in 2017.

The rally was jointly organised by Hong Kong Journalists Association, Hong Kong Press Photographers Association, Independent Commentators Association, Journalism Educators for Press Freedom, as well as staff associations of Ming Pao, Next Media and RTHK. It was attended by approximately 1,500 people.

=== 14 July Sha Tin march ===
==== Daytime rally ====
In addition to hanging vertical protest banners on hills and outside of buildings, Hong Kong protesters also use boats to showcase their vertical protest message horizontally moving along the river. A group called "Shatin Commons" claimed responsibility for hiring a boat on Shing Mun River to showcase their white-font-on-black fabric demanding the government to "Withdraw The Diabolical Bill" (「撤回惡法」) on 13 July. The following day in the afternoon, the first anti-extradition bill protest in the New Territories side of Hong Kong was held on 14 July in Sha Tin. The rally started from Chui Tin Street Soccer Pitch near Che Kung Miu at 3:10 pm, passing Hong Kong Heritage Museum, heading to the Sha Tin station Bus Terminus. Protesters chanted "all five demands must be fulfilled" and "Hong Kong police break laws." Sha Tin residents organised a protest carrying two black-and-white contrasting vertical protest banners: the white banner with black words stated "Mourning In Pain"(「痛心疾首」) and the black banner with white words demanded "Withdraw The Diabolical Bill" (「撤回惡法」 ). The first batch of protesters arrived at the destination at around 4:45 pm, and the march ended officially at 7:15 pm. The organiser claimed more than 115,000 marchers, while police estimated around 28,000.

==== Evening clashes ====
After the march, protesters moved to the streets near Sha Tin Jockey Club Swimming Pool. They set up barricades and threw objects including traffic cones and bottles at police at about 5 pm. Shortly afterwards, around 20 officers responded with pepper-spray. During the stand-off, nearby residents tossed down necessities, including water bottles, umbrellas and cling wrap, to support the protesters. At 6 pm, dozens of officers moved closer to the protesters but kept a distance, while warning the crowd to leave with a loudspeaker. Tension rose when a police officer attempted to remove the mask worn by a protester without showing his warrant card.

As the authorisation according to the Letter of No Objection had expired, protesters moved to the nearby shopping mall, New Town Plaza. At 8:55 pm, police warned the crowd that those who did not leave they would face arrest. Ten minutes later, police raised the red warning flag. At 10 pm, police started using pepper spray on some protesters in the plaza.

While protesters were trying to leave via MTR, riot police blocked the entrance of the train station from inside the mall. Meanwhile, another group of riot police followed behind protesters as they proceeded to the station engaging in a tactic called "kettling – thereby unnecessarily trapping demonstrators" – which sparked reactions from cornered protesters. At the same time, MTR Corporation announced that trains would bypass Sha Tin station. Both protesters and bystanders were trapped inside the plaza until the police started letting people enter the railway station later that night. Fearing that other protesters would not being able to leave, some individuals stopped the train's doors from closing to ensure that all protesters could evacuate. After some chaos, at around 11 pm, MTR announced that the service would gradually resume. Protesters then started to leave via MTR and the police started to disperse.

Lawmaker Jeremy Tam questioned the need for the police to block the entrance to the train station and bring about conflict which could have been avoided. Pro-democracy lawmaker Au Nok-hin, who was there that night, also asked why demonstrators were given no pathway to leave, and called the policing tactics "rubbish." Pro-Beijing lawmakers, on the other hand, claimed demonstrators were perpetrating "organised violent acts" and stated that "no one should insult the police [or] damage their morale." Chief Executive Carrie Lam stated that police "exercised restraint when they were being attacked by those whom I describe as 'rioters'." By the end of the night, at least 22 people had been hospitalised, several in critical and serious condition; and at least 40 arrests had been made.

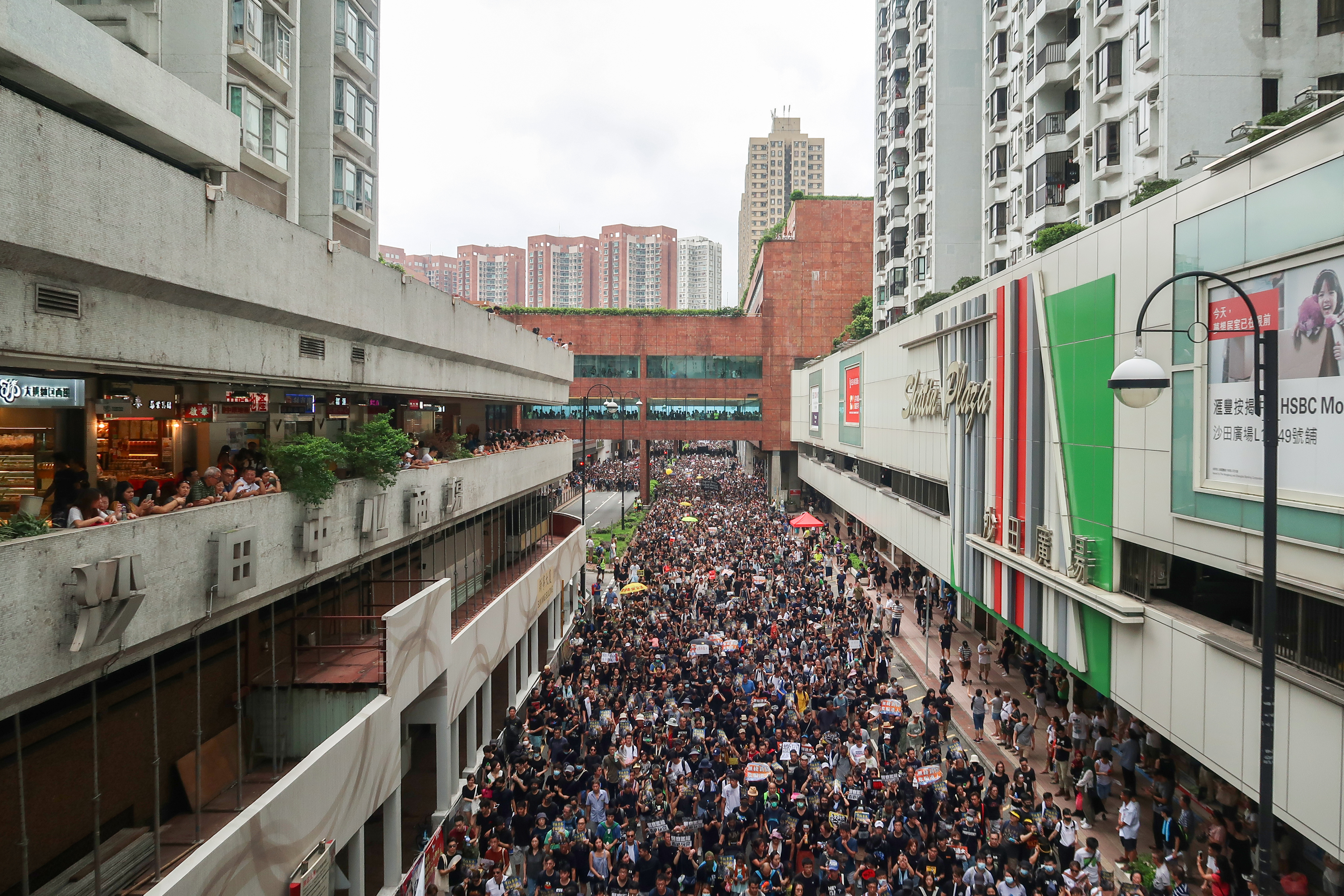
Tens of thousands marched in Sha Tin Town Centre near New Town Plaza on 14 July.

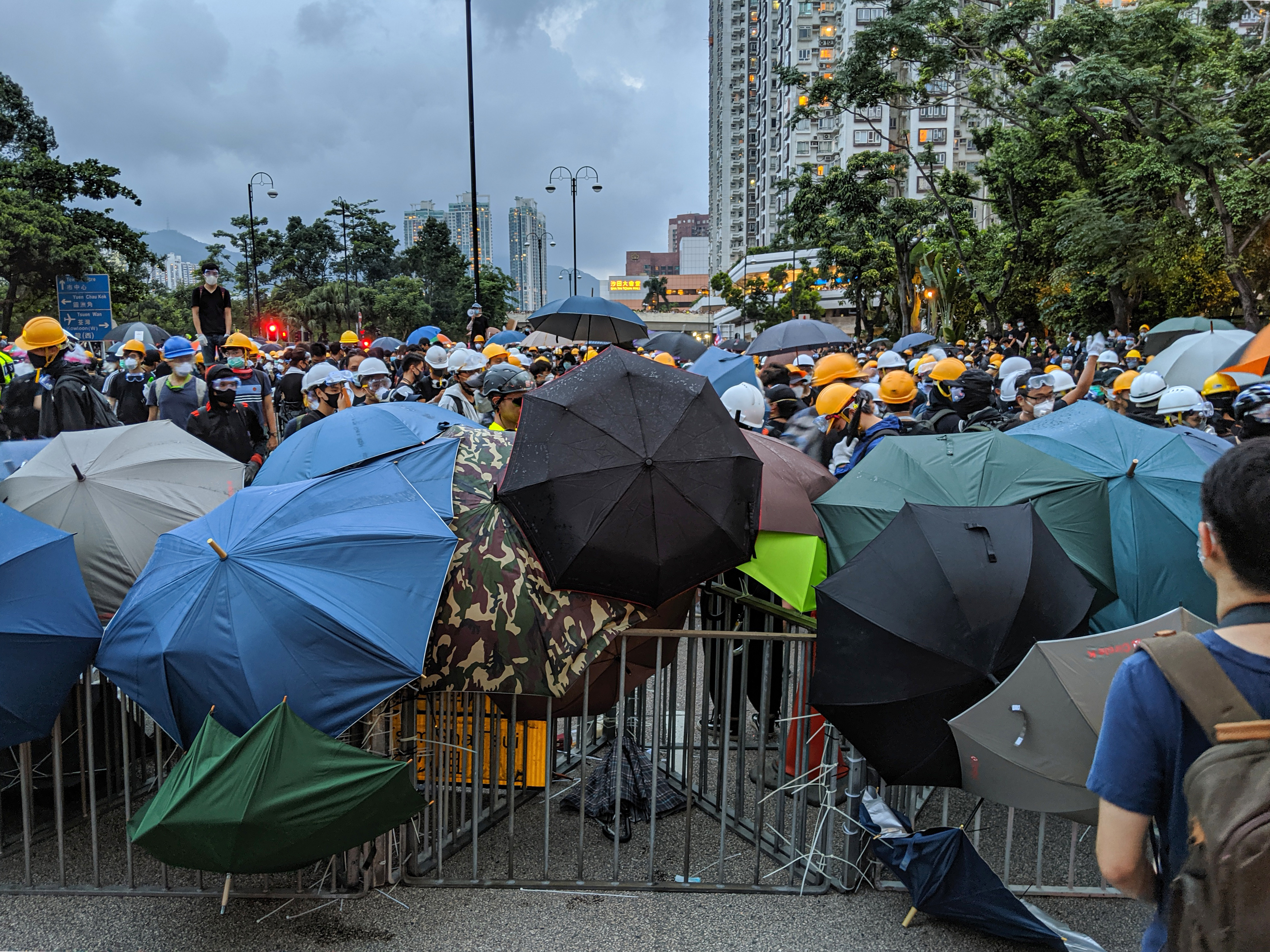
Protesters barricading a section of the roads

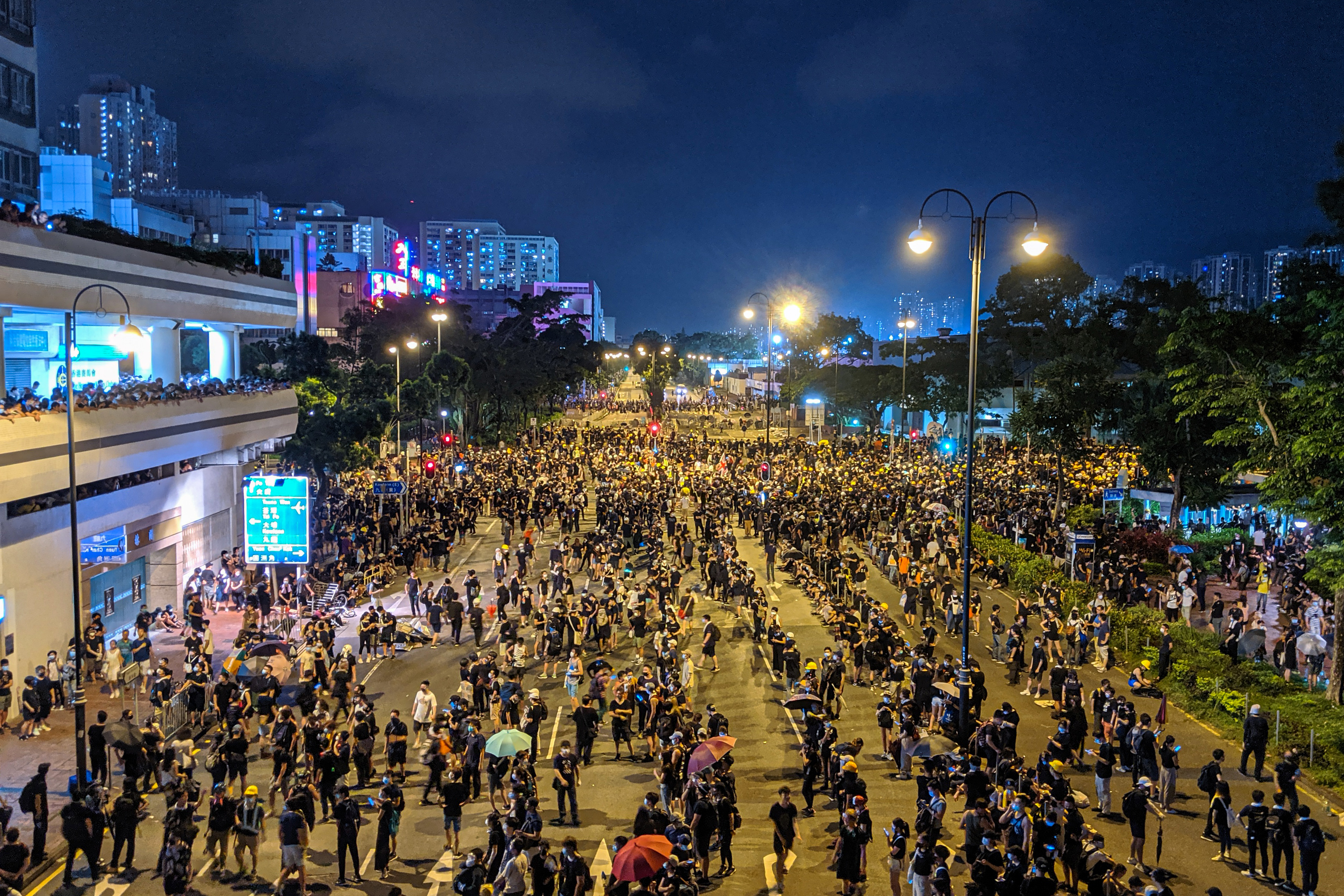
Stand-off between protesters and police near Sha Tin Jockey Club Swimming Pool. Night of 14 July.

=== 15 and 16 July accountability protests ===
Following the Sunday night clashes with police at New Town Plaza, on Monday evening about 100 demonstrators and local residents gathered at the mall to petition property owners about their responsibility and participation in the previous night's events. Activists surrounded the customer service desk to demand answers from Sun Hung Kai Properties. On Tuesday, several hundred people turned up again and demanded answers, accusing property owners of assisting police in the raid that led to numerous hospitalisations and arrests. Protesters chanted "shame on Sun Hung Kai for selling out Hongkongers"; many also walked through the mall and created Lennon Walls with post-it note messages containing their grievances. In a Facebook post, mall management denied involvement, saying they had not invited police onto the premises.

=== 15 July hunger strikers' march ===
On the evening of 15 July, a dozen hunger strikers (many of whom had been on strike for over 12 days), along with 2,400 protesters marched from Admiralty Centre to the Chief Executive's official residence – Government House. They called for the protesters' five demands to be answered and requested dialogue with Carrie Lam. While waiting for an audience with Lam, demonstrators created a post-it note Lennon Wall along the Government House complex walls. After waiting for over an hour, democracy activists left by about 11 pm, and marched back to Admiralty Centre. Carrie Lam did not make an appearance.

=== 17 July elderly march ===
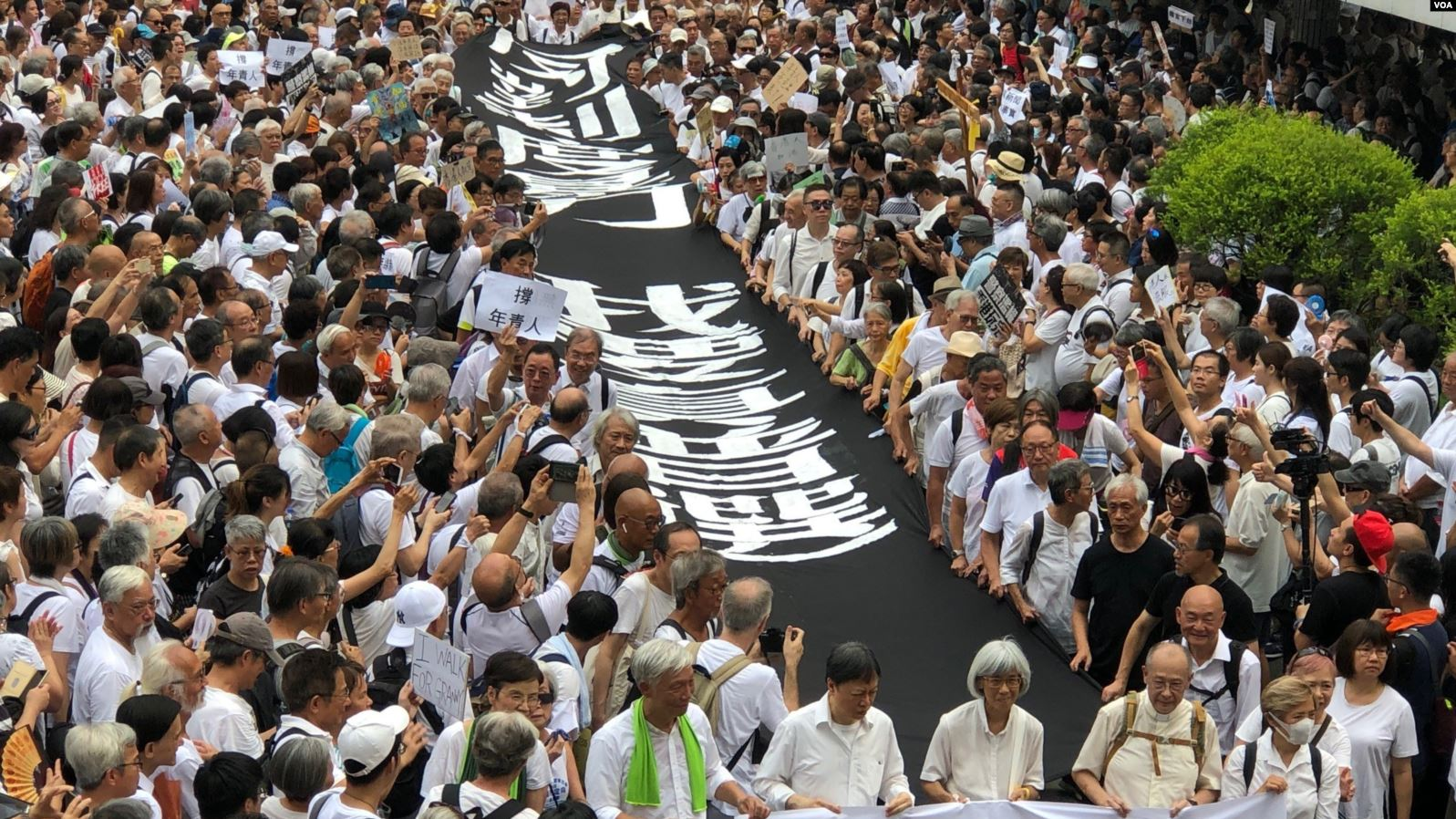
Elderly marching on 17 July in support to the youths in the anti-extradition bill protests.

A group of seniors, dressed in white, marched from Chater Garden to the Central Government Complex on 17 July 2019. Organisers estimated that 9,000 had participated, while police put the figure as 1,500. During the "silver-hair" rally organised by Chu Yiu-ming, participants showed their support for the frontline youths. They reiterated the five key demands of the democracy movement and hoped the march would clear the stereotype that all senior citizens held pro-establishment views. Reverend Chu Yiu-ming called on Carrie Lam to "repent" and urged compassion, asking her to stop dividing society by criminalising young protesters. Demonstrators carried massive vertical protest banners and smaller homemade placards, one of which said 'Children, daddy has come out', and upon reaching government buildings wrote demands onto yellow ribbons and tied them to a metal fence. Another black-with-white fonts vertical protest banner carried by marchers horizontally along the rally stated "Against Structural Violence; We Demand Genuine Universal Suffrage" (「反對制度暴力 我要真普選」). Actress Deanie Ip also attended, holding a banner that said "Support youth to protect Hong Kong."

=== 21 July march ===
==== Social workers silent march ====
Five social workers associations in Hong Kong, including the Hong Kong Social Workers' General Union, staged a silent march on 21 July. The protesters condemned Carrie Lam for ignoring people's demands and shifting the responsibility to resolve social conflicts to counsellors, social workers, and non-governmental organisations. According to organisers, about 4,000 were in attendance, while police cited 1500 in attendance.

==== CHRF march ====
The CHRF announced that the police had approved a march on Sunday, 21 July, from Admiralty to the Court of Final Appeal, despite earlier requests by the police to delay the march till August. The police, fearing the risk of increased violence, stipulated in its letter of no objection that the march would avoid Admiralty and end at Luard Road in Wan Chai, and must end no later than midnight on the basis of public safety and public order – conditions more stringent than those placed on previous marches. The CHRF claimed that 430,000 people attended the protest, while the police put the figure at 138,000.

Some protesters advanced beyond the police-mandated endpoint for the protest and marched to the Court of Final Appeal, the intended destination, and to Sheung Wan as the police began to retreat. Major roads and thoroughfares in Admiralty and Central were occupied by protesters, and the water barriers surrounding the Police HQ were turned into a Lennon Wall. Some protesters surrounded the Hong Kong Liaison Office in Sai Ying Pun, threw eggs and black ink at the building, and defaced the Chinese national emblem outside the Office. Another group of demonstrators vandalised the Central Police Station. Scuffles broke out next to Shun Tak Centre. Protesters threw bottles at the police while the police used five rounds of rubber bullets and 55 canisters of tear gas and 24 sponge grenades to disperse the protesters. The government condemned the protesters for besieging the Liaison Office.

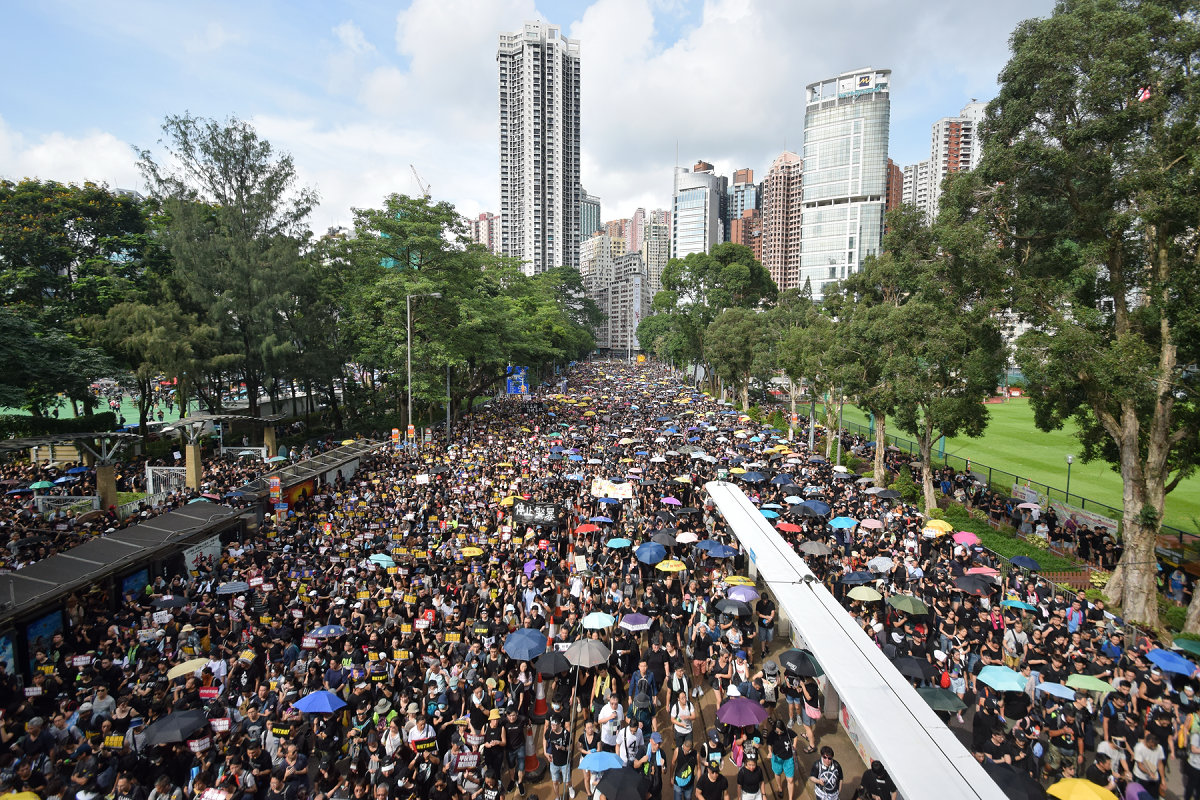
The CHRF march in the afternoon.

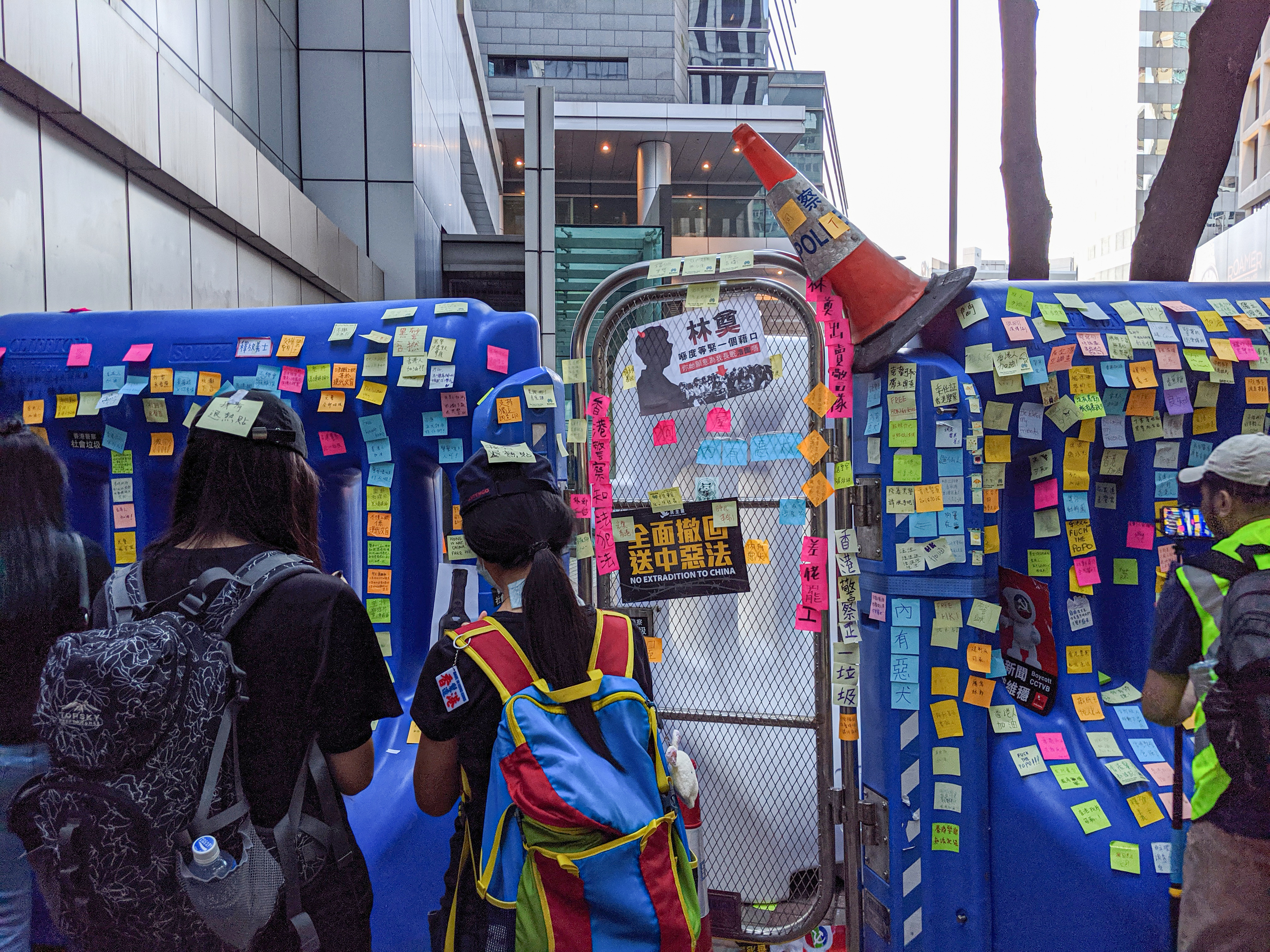
Post-it stickers on the water barricades set up by the police.

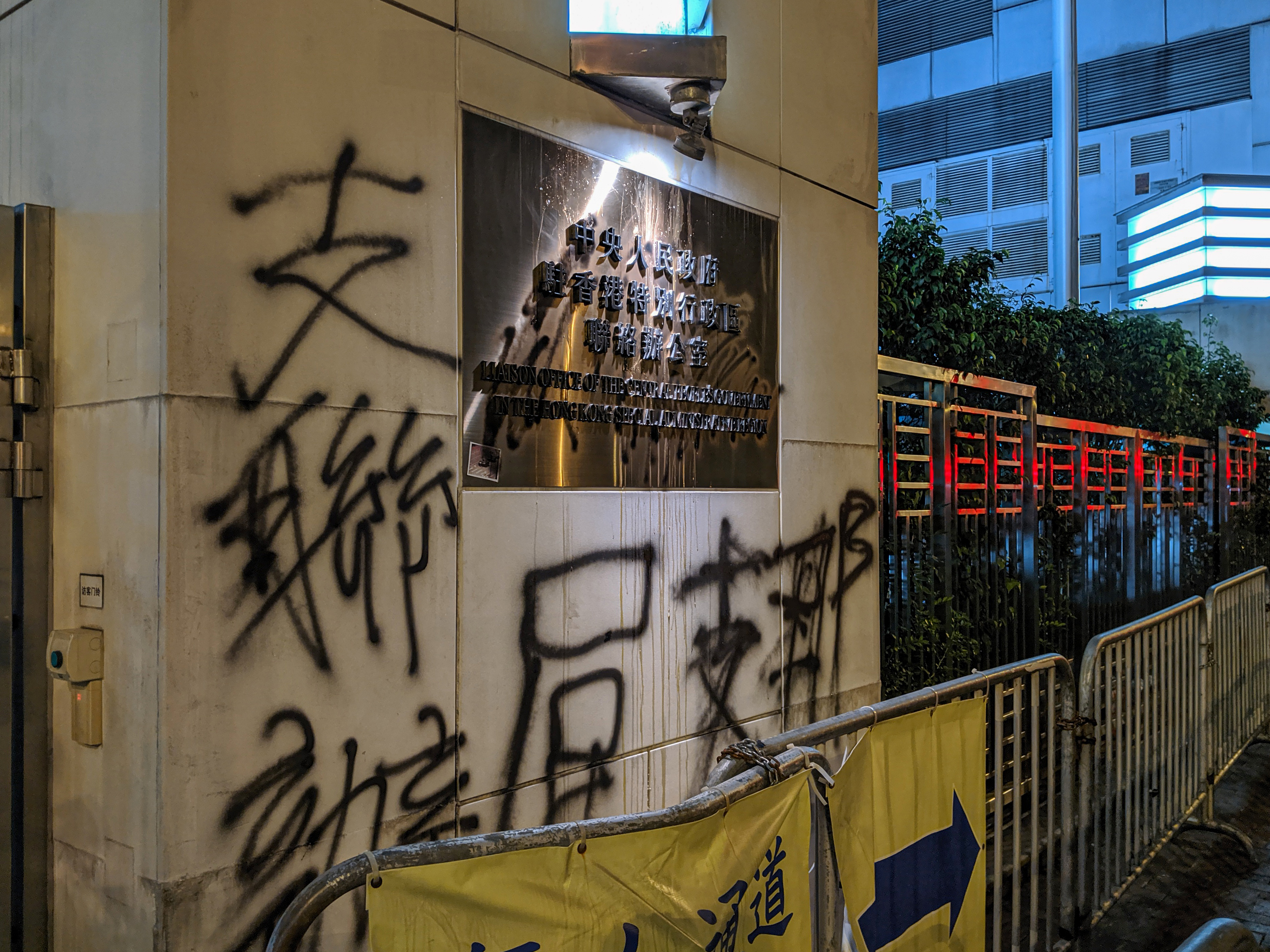
The Liaison Office of the Central People's Government after the protest, vandalised with a derogatory term against China.

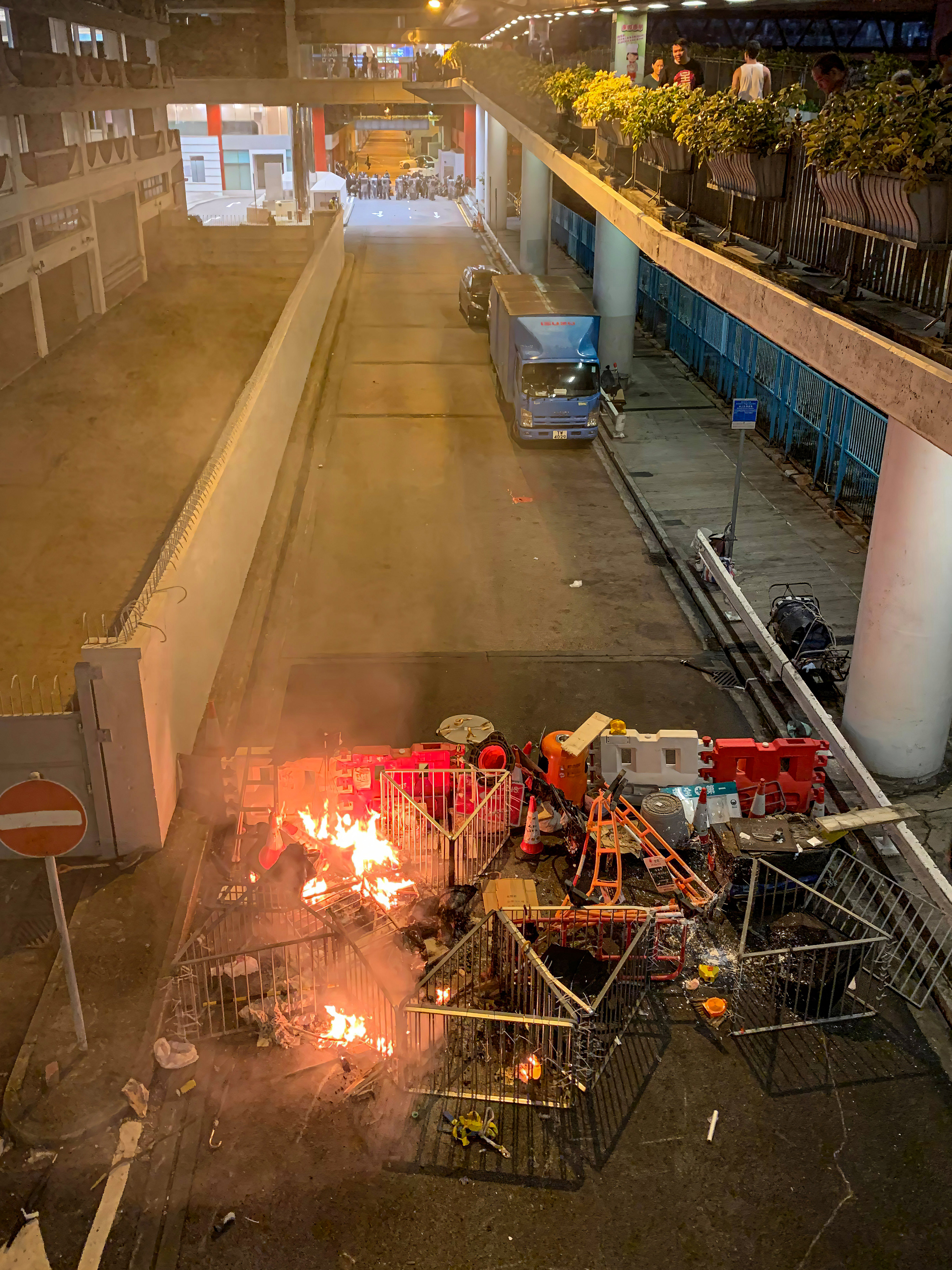
Protesters burned some items during the stand-off.

==== Yuen Long white-clad gang attack ====
In the evening, as scuffles in Sheung Wan were taking place, men wearing white shirts and armed with iron bars and wooden clubs gathered in Yuen Long, a town in the New Territories. At around 10 pm, they started indiscriminately attacking people and damaging cars on the street. They were reportedly targeting those wearing black, the dress code for the democracy rally on Hong Kong Island, but also made attacks on journalists and bystanders, including a woman holding a child and a pregnant woman.

Soon afterwards, about a hundred white-shirted men, mostly wearing masks, appeared at Yuen Long railway station and indiscriminately attacked people in the concourse, on the platform and inside train compartments. Two police officers who arrived at 10:52 pm left the station as they judged that they were in need of back-up. Thirty police officers arrived at the station at 11:20 pm, but the assailants had left. However, white-shirted assailants returned after midnight to launch a second wave of attacks on passengers; no police officers were present at the scene. Among the injured were Legislative Council member Lam Cheuk-ting and two reporters; another journalist's equipment was also smashed. At least 45 citizens were hospitalised, including three in a serious condition and one in a critical condition. In a statement shortly after midnight, the Hong Kong government condemned both the white-shirted attackers and protesters for their confrontations and injuries despite repeated warnings by police.

The local police call centre was overwhelmed by a flood of calls between 10 pm and midnight. According to The Washington Post as many as 24,000 emergency calls were placed regarding the incidents that night. Yoho Mall, the shopping mall next to Yuen Long station had also apparently failed to reach the police. The hundreds that turned up at a police station near Yuen Long to report the incident found the door shuttered. Overnight, the police confronted the mobsters in Nam Pin Wai Village and confiscated several steel bars, though no arrest was made due to the lack of evidence. Following these incidents, various news media published video documentaries detailing the timeline of the attacks. The tactic of using gangsters to silence protest is well known in mainland China, where local authorities hire thugs to deal with both petitioners and residents unwilling to leave their homes.

The delayed police response to reports of violence was heavily criticised by activists and legislators. Officials blamed the delay on staffing constraints due to protests elsewhere while Legislator Eddie Chu said there was "clear collusion between police and the gangs." Police officials denied the allegations and Chief Executive Carrie Lam said accusations of co-operation with gangsters were "groundless" and "insulting". These attacks appeared to repeat the pattern of Triad attacks seen during the 2014 Umbrella Movement, when there was also a lack of timely police response.

On the following day, 30 protesters demonstrated at Yuen Long police station to condemn the attacks and the delayed police response, the alleged collusion between police and triad gangs. Hundreds of social workers then marched to the same police station to report the violence. Legislator Junius Ho's alleged involvement in the attacks prompted protesters to trash his office in Tsuen Wan.

On 26 August, two men were charged and held without bail in relation to the Yuen Long attacks. Of the 30 people who had been arrested, with some of the alleged to have links to organised crime syndicates, only four individuals were charged as suspects. Court hearings were scheduled to begin on 25 October.

=== 26 July airport sit-in ===
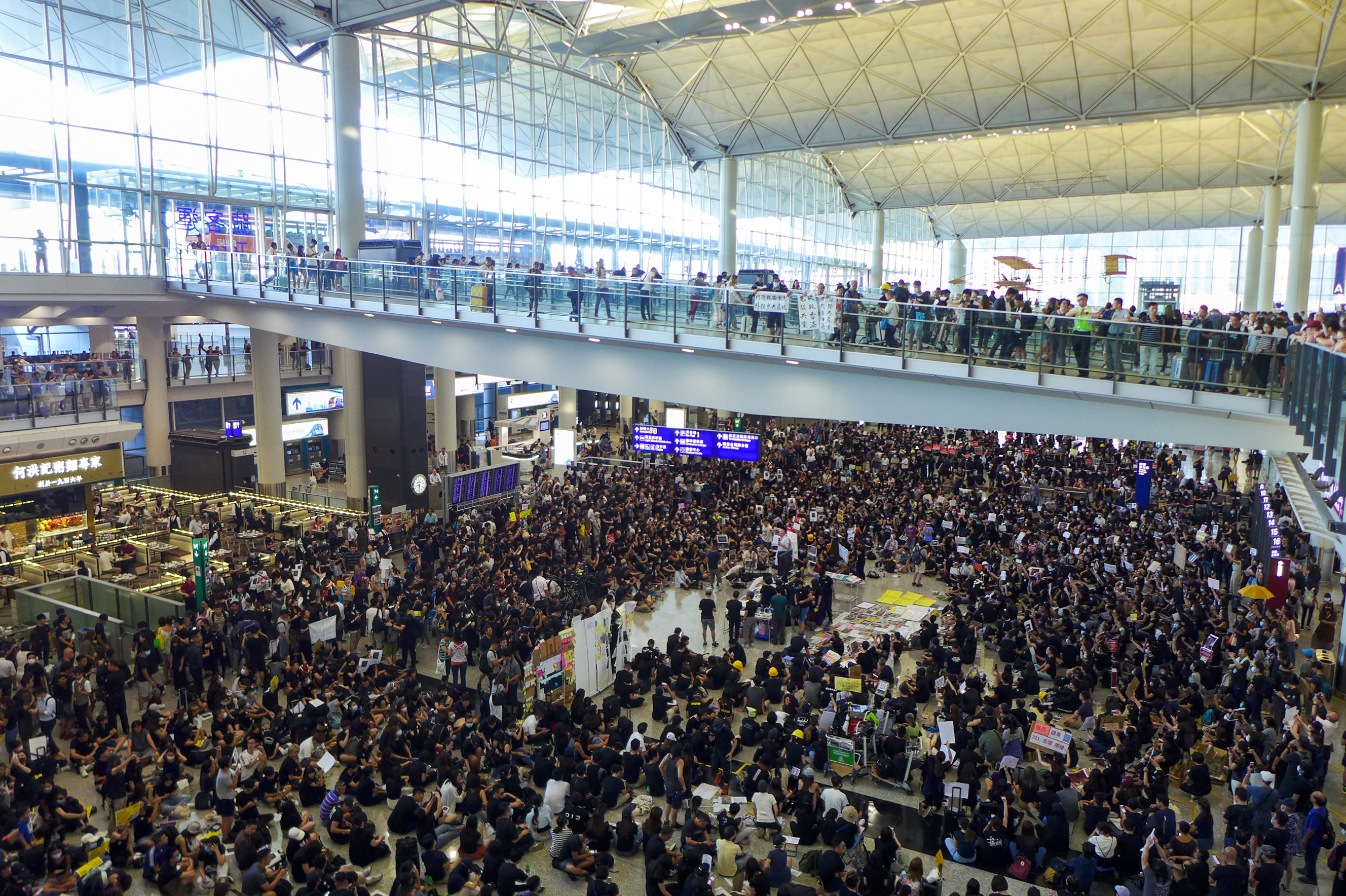
The sit-in protest in the arrival hall of the Hong Kong International Airport on 26 July.

A sit-in, organised in the arrival hall of Hong Kong International Airport by airline industry workers, airport staff, and the Cathay Pacific Flight Attendants' Union, aimed to engage with arriving tourists and raise awareness about the on-going democracy movement. Before the sit-in, the Airport Authority removed some seats to provide more space to the protesters, and marked out areas where loitering was not allowed. Additional security and staff were deployed.

Thousands of protesters gathered in the arrival halls of Terminal 1. Dressed in black, they handed out leaflets and pamphlets to tourists in several languages, including Japanese and simplified Chinese, while chanting "Welcome to Hong Kong, stay safe" and "free Hong Kong." A television monitor showed police action toward protesters in previous demonstrations, and the Yuen Long violence. A Lennon Wall allowed protesters to leave their own supportive messages. A petition collected more than 14,000 signatures from aviation workers, tourists and residents, demanding police arrest those who participated in the Yuen Long violence and asking for an independent inquiry into the allegedly excessive force used by police.

=== 27 July Reclaim Yuen Long ===
Despite a police ban on the rally, thousands turned up on 27 July to protest the violent mob attack in Yuen Long the previous Sunday. Prior to the protest, a man was arrested for the stabbing of a pro-democracy activist dressed in black. The protesters marched on the main roads in Yuen Long, and surrounded the Yuen Long police station. Leonard Cheng, the president of Lingnan University, joined the march as an observer and became the first university chief to attend a protest since the Umbrella Revolution in 2014. The organisers claimed an attendance of about 288,000. To disperse the protesters, the police fired tear gas in a primarily residential area and in the evening, the stand-offs between the protesters and the police escalated into violent clashes inside Yuen Long station.

=== 28 July protest ===
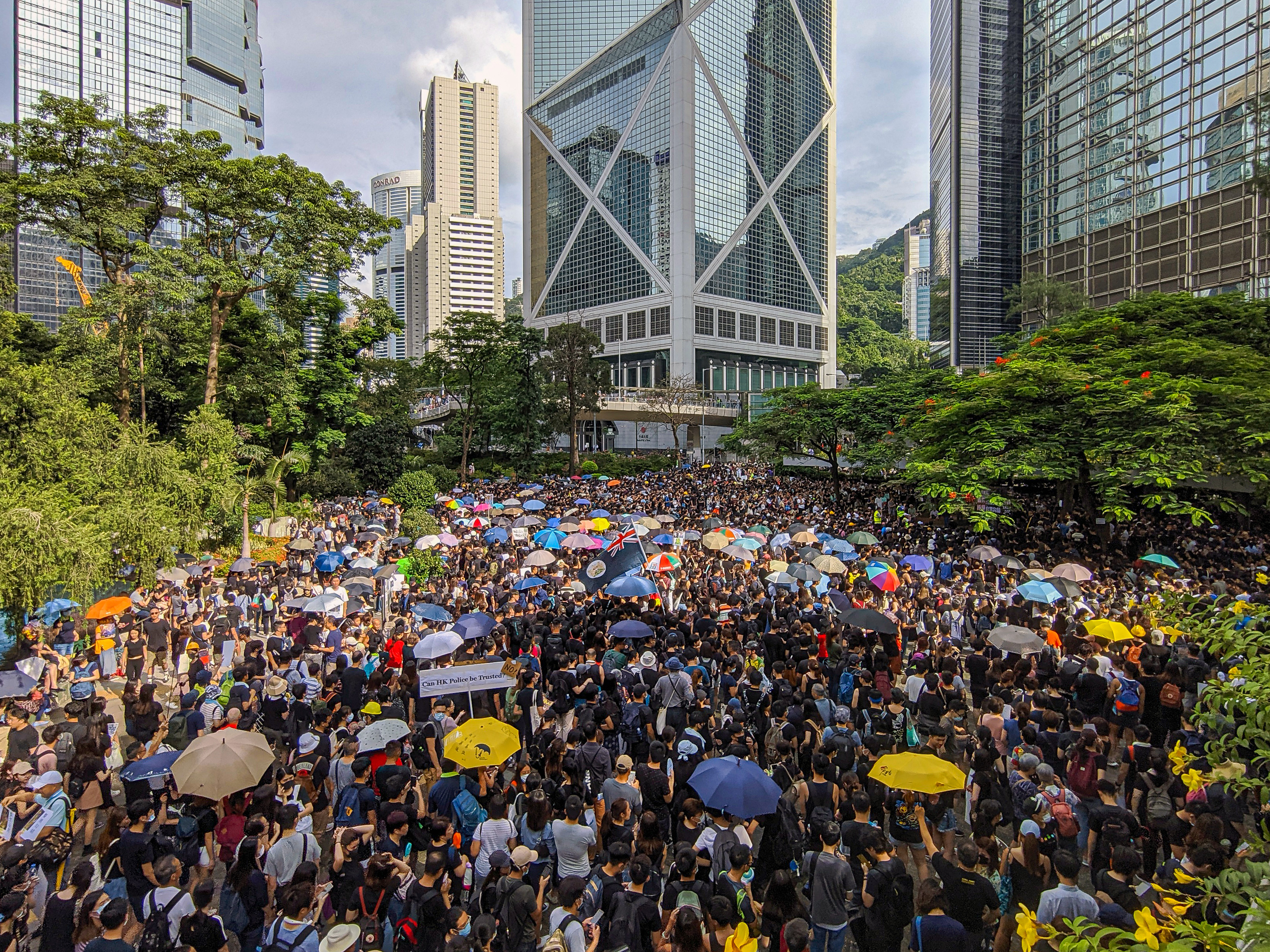
Protesters in Chater Garden on 28 July.

The day before protests, police approved a sit-in at Chater Garden, a public park in Central, but banned the demonstration to be held in Sheung Wan. On 28 July, tens of thousands of protesters gathered in the park and marched on the streets towards Causeway Bay and Sai Wan in defiance of police restrictions. They chanted in Cantonese: "Hong Kong police, knowingly break the law" (Chinese: 香港警察，知法犯法) and "Liberate Hong Kong, the revolution of our times" (Chinese: 光復香港，時代革命).

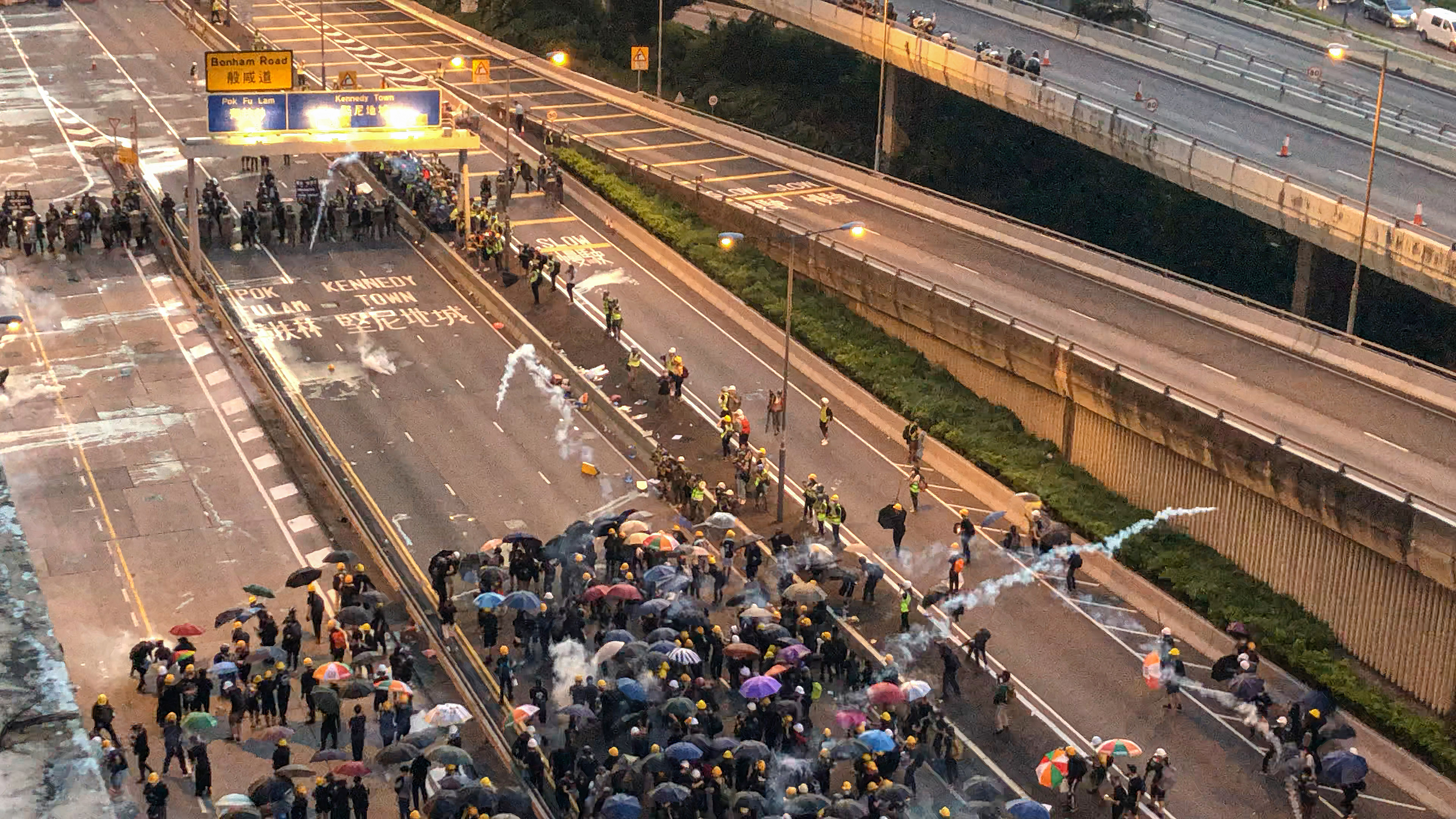
Police firing tear gas to protesters in Sheung Wan on 28 July.

Protesters arrived at Hennessy Road, outside Sogo Hong Kong, and constructed barricades. At the same time, a smaller group of about 200 protesters headed west towards the Liaison Office of the Central Government. Police and riot-police arrived shortly after, warning protesters of "unlawful assembly."

At night, the stand-off evolved into violent clashes. Police fired numerous rounds of tear gas, rubber bullets, sponge grenades and pepper spray to disperse protesters. Police stated that protesters removed railings from streets, threw bricks, set fire to items, pushed a metal cart with papers on fire, and used a Y-shaped catapult to shoot metal balls at police. At least 16 people were injured and 49 were arrested for rioting and possessing offensive weapons.

Following a District Court trial, 21 protesters were sentenced on 8 January 2022 for their participation, with 12 being jailed for three and a half years, six for 37 months, one for 40 months, one for 38 months, and one for two and a half years, the lightest sentence owing to a guilty plea of the defendant. Three defendants were acquitted.

=== 30 and 31 July solidarity rallies ===
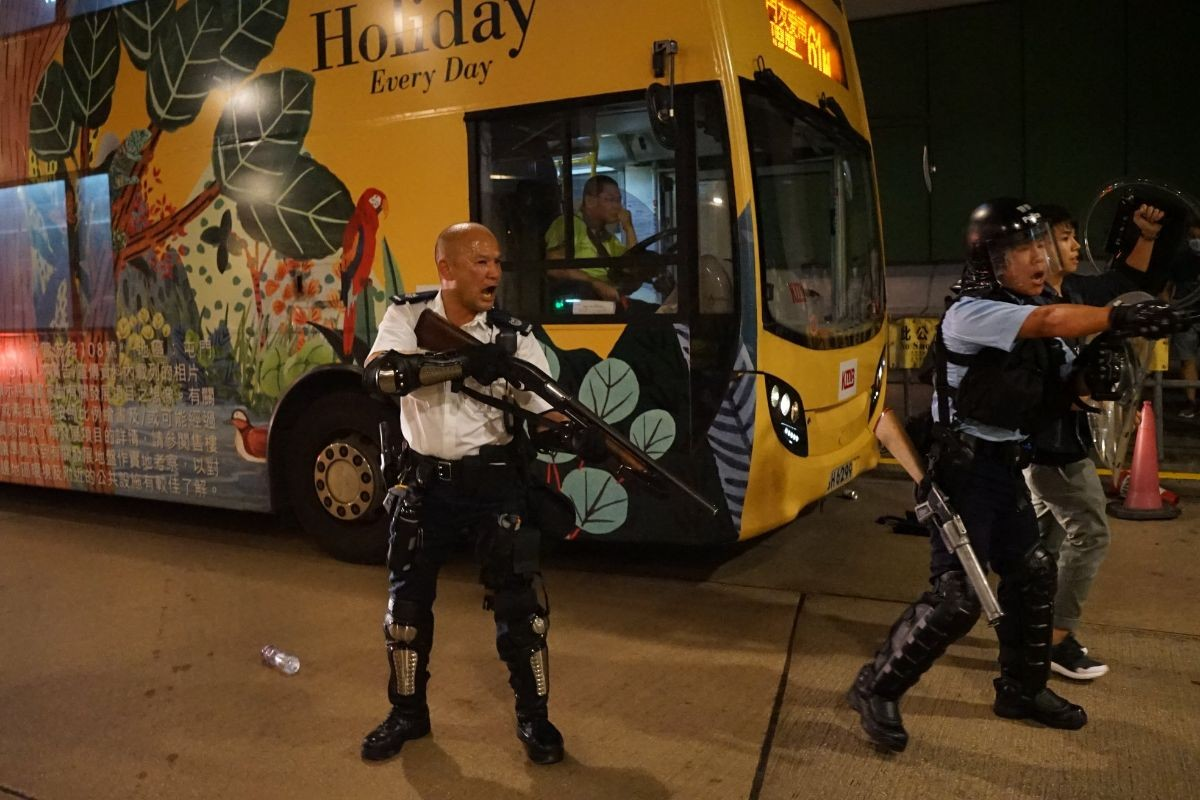
Lau Chak Kei pointed his gun against citizens in Kwai Chung on 30 July 2019.

On 30 July hundreds of protesters gathered outside of the Kwai Chung Police Station after news spread that a majority of the 49 people arrested during confrontations with police on Sunday at Sheung Wan would be charged with rioting – an offence punishable by ten years in prison. Police used pepper spray and batons to disperse the crowd. One police officer who had been surrounded was seen pointing a gun loaded with beanbag rounds at protesters. Police said that the officer was "protect[ing] his life and personal safety".

Similar solidarity protests occurred that night at Tin Shui Wai police station, where hundreds had gathered to support two young people who were arrested during an altercation at a Lennon Wall. During the demonstration, fireworks were launched out of a moving vehicle into the assembled crowd. At least 10 were injured in the attack. Three men were arrested two weeks after the attack.

On 31 July demonstrators gathered at the Eastern District Court to support the 44 people due to face rioting charges. Amnesty International released a statement, calling the definitions of illegal assembly and rioting under Hong Kong law "so broad they fall far short of international standards" and further stated that "individuals facing these sweeping charges would [not] have a fair chance of defending themselves at trial." A group of local prosecutors also released a public letter, asserting that the decision to prosecute was politically motivated because it failed the two criteria of whether there was adequate evidence and a reasonable prospect of conviction, or whether it was in line with public interest.

== Counter-protests ==
On 15 July, dozens of protesters from ten Pro-Beijing groups including the Democratic Alliance for the Betterment and Progress of Hong Kong (DAB) held a demonstration in support of the police and condemned the protesters for violently attacking the police.

On 17 July 70 members from the DAB and Politihk Social Strategic including lawmakers Ann Chiang, Elizabeth Quat, Wilson Or and Junius Ho Kwan-yiu held demonstrations outside the Wan Chai Police Station to express their support for the police, urge them to rethink their operations when dealing with ongoing protests and called the government to ban protests until September.

On 18 July, around 30 supporters from the Pro-Beijing organisation of The Friends of Hong Kong Association held a demonstration outside the Wan Chai police's headquarters to show their support. They also donated 10 million Hong Kong dollars to the police welfare fund.

On 19 July 20 members from the pro-Beijing group, the Justice Alliance led by Leticia Lee held a demonstration out the Police Headquarters, where they delivered 10,000 juice boxes to the police and called on officers to "show no mercy" to protesters.

On 20 July, a demonstration organised by pro-Beijing coalition Safeguard Hong Kong Alliance occurred at Tamar Park to show solidarity for the police and support for the extradition bill. The organisers claimed that 316,000 attended, while police cited 103,000. Chan Pak-cheung, Maria Cordero, Elsie Leung and Maria Tam, former police chief Tang King-shing, and pro-Beijing legislators Regina Ip and Starry Lee attended and took turns giving speeches on the stage.
