= Timeline of the 2019–2020 Hong Kong protests (March 2020) =

March events of the 2019–2020 pro-democracy demonstrations in Hong Kong

Timeline of the 2019–2020 Hong Kong protests
2019			March–June				July	August	September	October	November	December
2020	January	February	March	April	May	June	July	August	September	October	November	December
2021	January	February	March	April	May	June	July	August	September–November			December

This is a list of protests in March 2020 that were part of the 2019–2020 Hong Kong protests. Protests activities largely centered around anniversaries of major events of the protests in 2019; there were also gatherings in shopping malls. Due to the growth of cases of the first wave of the COVID-19 pandemic in the city – which would not be checked until April –, the protests were generally of considerably smaller size than before the pandemic. Police drew the dissatisfaction of demonstrators and pro-democratic politicians for their heavy-handed tactics, and for their perceived overuse of coronavirus restriction policies to dissolve rallies.

== Events ==
=== 7 March ===
To commemorate the suicide of Marco Leung on 15 June 2019, protesters held a mourning event. At about 7 pm, over 150 people were mourning on the sidewalk outside Pacific Place and presenting flowers, lighting candles, chanting slogans, and singing "Glory to Hong Kong".

=== 8 March ===
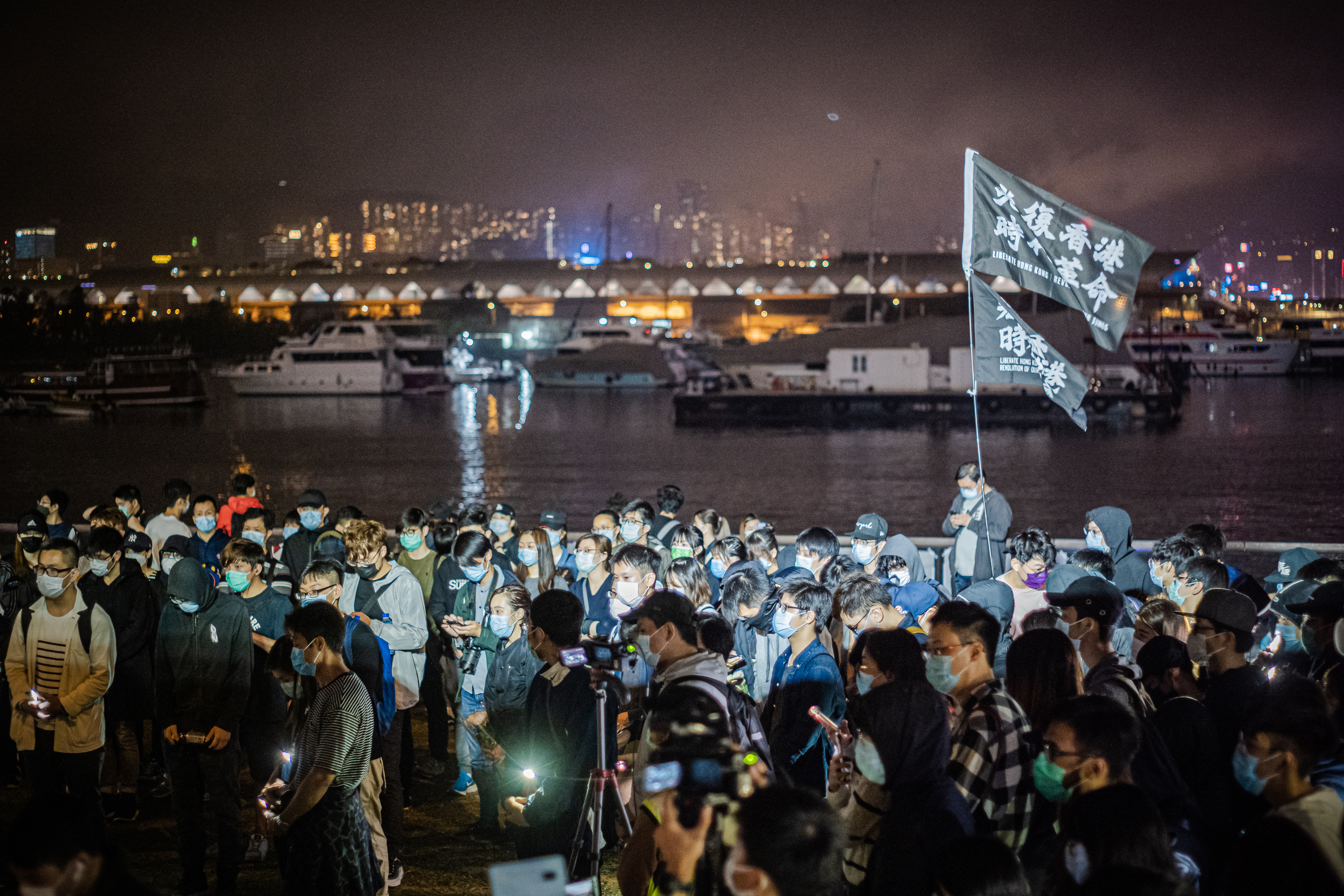
Protesters at Kwun Tong Promenade.

For the four-month milestone of Chow Tsz-lok's death, some protesters launched mourning activities in the Kwun Tong Promenade and the parking lot at Sheung Tak Estate in Tseung Kwan O. Before the event at Sheung Tak Estate began, a large number of riot police officers were patrolling the parking lot and searched private cars in the vicinity. At about 7:30 in the evening, more than 100 protesters went to the altar at a Christian cross mounted outside the car park to mourn, playing poetry and lighting candles. At 8:09, the time when Chow Tsz-lok died, people at the scene observed a minute of silence. At 8:20, police raised the blue warning flag, thereby giving warning that the assembly was unauthorised, and asked the protesters and journalists to leave. They sealed off a pedestrian road and checked ID cards and belongings of nearly 300 people, and raised the blue warning flag at least four more times. Video footage of a police clearance operation appeared to show a member of the riot police using his shield to push a female reporter, who was wearing a helmet and reflective vest, to the ground, with the reporter suffering injuries to the back of her head. A total of 46 men and 17 women, aged 14 to 37, were arrested at the scene for illegal assembly, possession of imitation firearms, and possession of offensive weapons. In addition, a mourning event was held at Kwun Tong Promenade. Some people mourned at the scene with a Lennon wall and wrote the words "Keep up the heat and fight to the end". Protests also erupted in Tai Po earlier that day at 2:00 in the afternoon.

Dozens of local residents gathered at the Tin Hau Temple for a rally to oppose the government's proposal to transform the Tai Po Jockey Club General Out-patient Clinic into a dedicated clinic for COVID-19 patients. At 3:15, police declared the assembly illegal. More than 100 protestors walked towards the Tai Po Centre, shouting slogans. Some protestors threw debris on the roads. Police made 23 arrests.

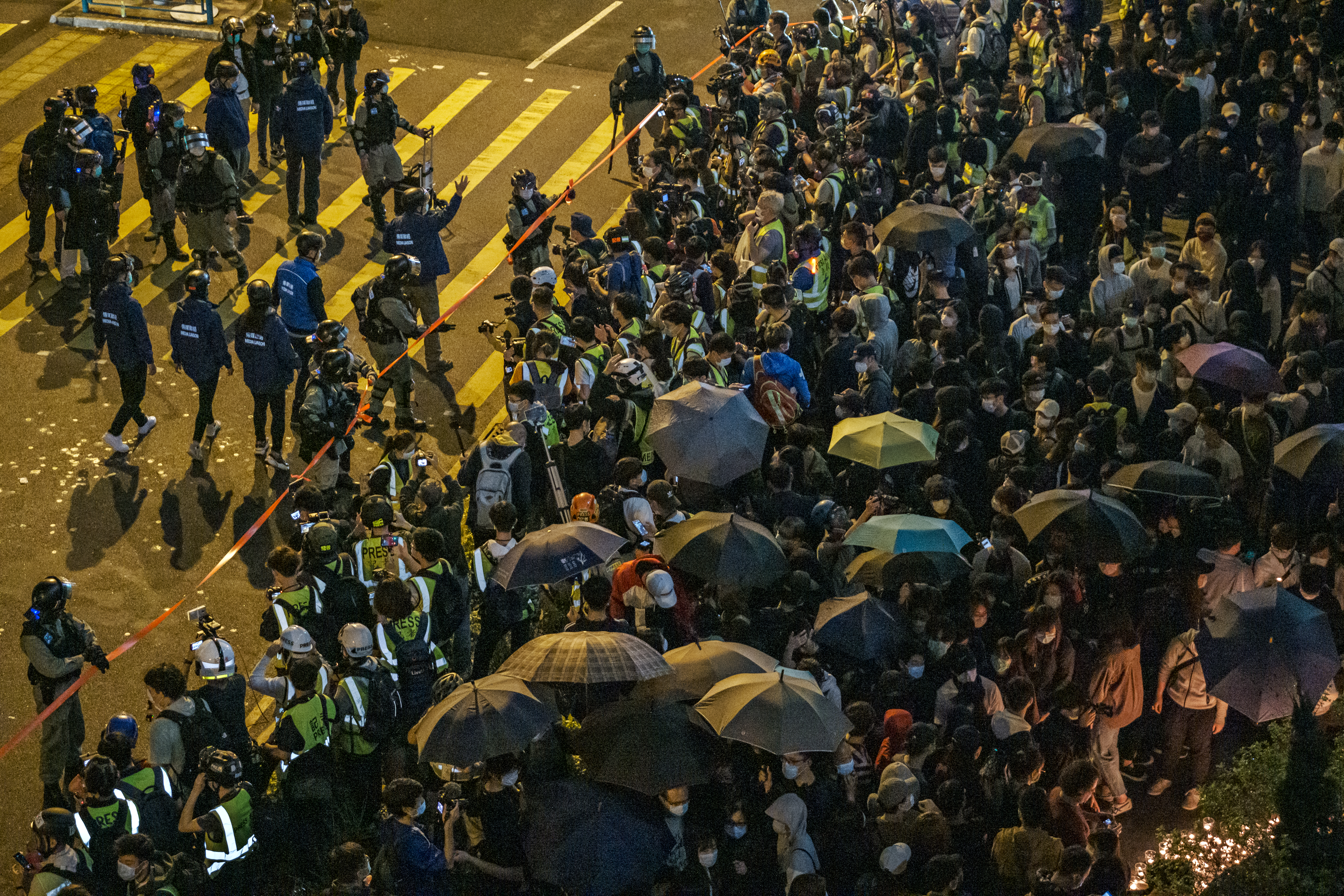
Protesters at the car park where Chow Tsz-lok died, 8 March.

=== 12 March ===
Protesters started demonstration in multiple districts of Hong Kong at 7:30pm. Riot police were patrolling at the demonstrations from the start. Among them, a large number of riot police patrolled in Mong Kok, searching people from time to time. At the end of the scheduled demonstrations at 9 pm, some protesters made a roadblock using miscellaneous items on Sai Yeung Choi Street near Soy Street. Riot police arrived at the scene and immediately set up a blockade. As they demanded that reporters return to the pavement, they constantly pushed them; also, they shone flashlights at demonstrators and warned that pepper spray may be deployed. Police also intercepted more than 20 protesters inside the Sai Yeung Choi Street blockade. Six people were arrested.

At 10 pm, some protesters set fire to a makeshift blockade on Shantung Street. Several riot police arrived on the scene to extinguish the fire, and then investigated any criminal wrongdoing.

=== 19 March ===
Some protesters continued to launch a "Lunch with You" rally. At about 1 pm, about 30 protesters gathered in the IFC mall. Some people held signs and then began to sing and yell slogans such as "Five Demands, Not One Less". After about 20 minutes, the protesters started marching inside the mall. By 2 pm, the crowd dispersed peacefully.

=== 21 March ===
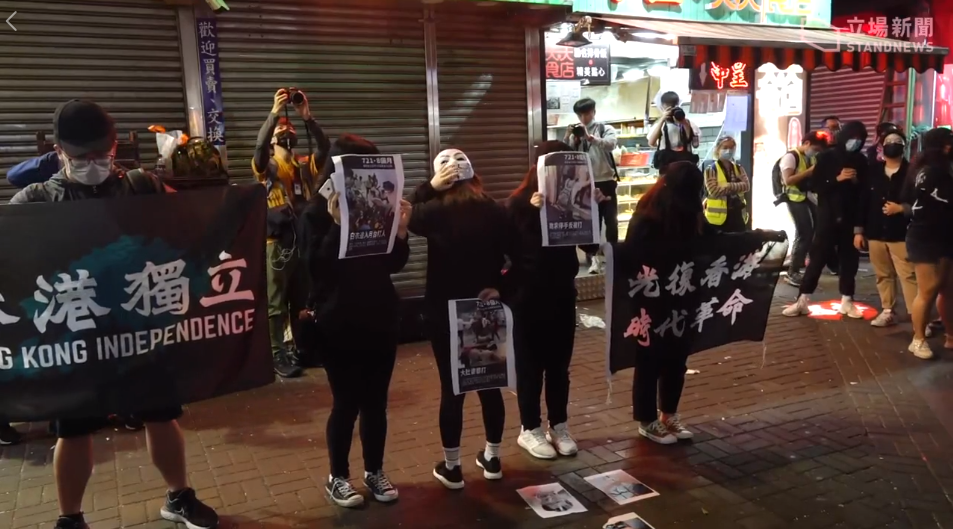
Protesters calling for Hong Kong independence

For the eight-month anniversary of the Yuen Long attack, in mid-afternoon, over 30 security guards and police were deployed at Yuen Long Station and over 50 riot police were stationed at the transport interchange outside the station. Police then set up roadblocks to inspect vehicles one by one at the Yuen Long section of Castle Peak Road.

At night, some protesters gathered in Yuen Long. During the time, some protesters blocked the road and threw petrol bombs in Qianse Square on Datang Road. Riot police fired multiple tear gas canisters without lifting the warning flag. About 30 members of the Special Tactical Squad perused them. Police officers then intercepted and arrested a number of protesters. During the arrest, riot police applied pepper spray to reporters and protesters at the scene. Several reporters were sprayed in the eyes, with members of the Legislative Council Hui Chi-fung, Roy Kwong and Andrew Wan also being sprayed. 61 people were arrested, including Zachary Wong, the chairman of Yuen Long District Council.

Following the arrest of Wong, a joint statement of the 17 District Council Chairmen, Vice-chairmen and representatives criticised the police for continuing to over arrest and deteriorating police-public relations.

In addition, protesters held a sit-in at Causeway Bay Station, Heng Fa Chuen Station and Chaiwan Station. Police deployed a large number of riot police and uniformed police to the stations, intercepting young people passing by from time to time. Among them, at the Causeway Bay Station at 7pm 50 citizens moved to the second floor of Times Square to hold a sit in. At 9:31, during the gathering of the protesters at Times Square, a number of riot police arrived and intercepted a dozen protesters. Police officers pushed down a protester and pepper sprayed him. Afterwards, police pepper sprayed a number of onlookers and reporters, arresting a man. At least three people were arrested. Police then closed the mall.

In Fanling, the activists Hendrick Lui and Wong Ka-ho, who had both participated in the 2019 Hong Kong local elections, tried together with an assistant to stop a group of people from attacking a man. The man had gotten into a heated argument with the group about the controversial national security law proposal. Lui and Wong suffered injuries. Police arrived only after the assailants had left, and investigated the incident.

=== 31 March ===
On occasion of the seven-month anniversary of the 2019 Prince Edward station attack, anti-government protesters gathered at the site of the incident. Some demonstrators gathered and hurled abuse at the police. After warning the demonstrators that they were part of an unlawful assembly, the police made 54 arrests. The charges included illegal assembly, public disorder, possession of instrument fit for unlawful purpose, and theft, but did not relate to the social-distancing rules in effect since 29 March to counter the spread of the coronavirus pandemic.

== Counter-demonstrations ==
On 2 March dozens of citizens gathered at Chater Garden, Central, at 3:30 in the afternoon, and held a five-star flag and banner to protest at the US Consulate, accusing the US of interference in Hong Kong affairs after Jimmy Lai was arrested and charged.
