= Timeline of reactions to the 2020 Hong Kong national security law (October 2020) =

October events of the 2019–2020 pro-democracy demonstrations in Hong Kong

Timeline of the 2019–2020 Hong Kong protests
2019			March–June				July	August	September	October	November	December
2020	January	February	March	April	May	June	July	August	September	October	November	December
2021	January	February	March	April	May	June	July	August	September–November			December

Apart from protests on 1 October—the Chinese National Day—most of the significant events of the 2019–2020 Hong Kong protests in October 2020 took place away from the streets, and many of them outside Hong Kong and China. The threat to protests posed by the national security law was exacerbated by continued uncertainty about the fate of twelve detainees who had attempted to escape to Taiwan by boat in August, and were held across the border in Shenzhen; on 10 October, Hong Kong police detained nine further individuals in relation to that incident. In addition, the Hong Kong government did not relax the four-person gathering limit that had been enacted in the course of the third wave of the COVID-19 pandemic, and the police continued to strictly enforce it. Pan-democrats in the city considered the restrictive gathering limit to be a pretext for curbing protests, also given that other pandemic related restrictions were relaxed in the course of the month.

Several Western governments undertook actions that suggested that, in view of the developments surrounding the national security law, they no longer had full confidence regarding the ability of the Hong Kong judiciary to conduct fair trials according to Western standards. Canada accepted a couple from Hong Kong as refugees, while Germany accepted an alleged student protester. Both of these actions met with a rebuke by mainland and Hong Kong officials. On 22 October, the United Kingdom finalized a new visa arrangement specially designed for Hongkongers born before the 1997 handover of the city, creating an immigration path for them, to open in January 2021.

== Events ==
=== 1 October ===
==== National Day arrests ====
At least 86 people were arrested for alleged unlawful assembly during National Day protests. According to reports cited by The Guardian, police handed out fines to pro-democracy campaigners for violating pandemic restrictions, but failed to take similar action against pro-Beijing groups celebrating that day.

==== Solidarity protests against Communist China ====
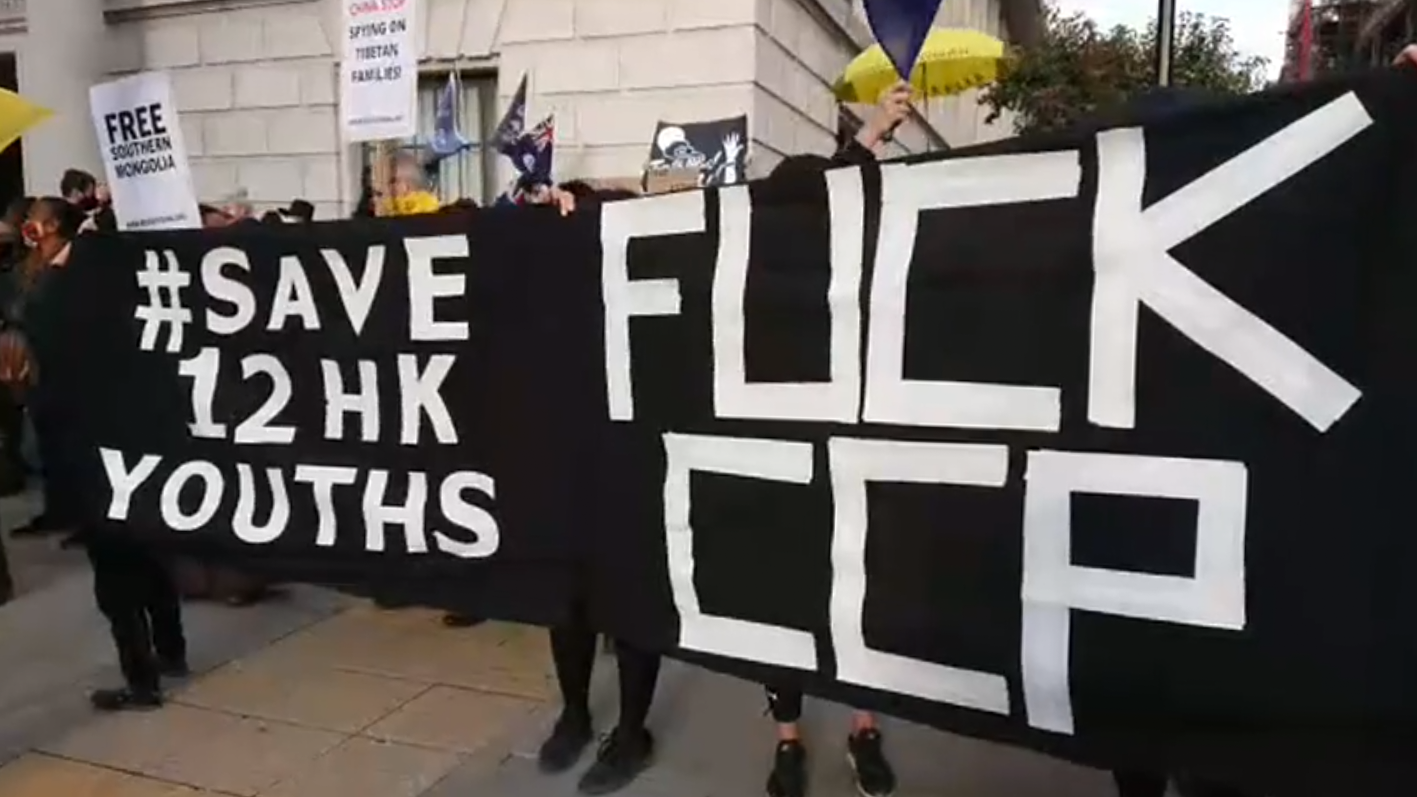
Solidarity protests in London on October 1, 2020

A campaign titled "Resist China" called upon all citizens to speak up against the oppression, threats, and invasion caused by Communist China in Hong Kong, Xinjiang, Tibet, Inner Mongolia and Taiwan on Communist China's national day. Over 25 countries saw protests taking place in front of the country's Chinese embassy or consulate building. Toronto and Vancouver from Canada saw a large number of Hongkongers, Tibetans, Vietnamese, Mongolians, Taiwanese and other communities. Protests also took place in various cities across the United States such as San Francisco, Los Angeles, Boston, and New York City as well as cross the globe in Pretoria in South Africa, and in India. In London, United Kingdom, some Hong Kong protesters waved flags reading "Liberate Hong Kong, revolution of our times", a slogan banned in Hong Kong under the national security law, chanted slogans and burned a Chinese flag in front of the Chinese consulate. The Chinese government condemned such behavior and demanded actions from the United Kingdom.

=== 3 October ===
==== Solidarity protests: Tokyo, Japan ====
Hundreds of protesters showed support for Hong Kong's pro-democracy movement, along with support for persecuted ethnic groups in China, on the streets of Shinjuku.

=== 5 October ===
==== Organizer of German petition warned by self-proclaimed Hong Kong public servant on social media ====
On behalf of German pro-protest lobbying group Wir für Hongkong, Hong Kong pro-democracy activist Glacier Kwong now studying in Germany, and German journalist, pro-democracy activist and sinologist David Missal, who was expelled from China in 2018 while studying at Qinghua University, started an online petition seeking 50,000 international signatures to add China onto the German parliament's meeting agenda. Kwong shared on her social media a screenshot of a threat received by her, allegedly sent from a "Hong Kong public servant", warning her to stop her activism or else she wouldn't be allowed to return to Hong Kong. Kwong shared that since the beginning of the petition she had received more such threats than previously. She said that she considered it a possibility that she would be arrested immediately if she should return to Hong Kong.

==== National security law effect: investment firm Motley Fool leaves Hong Kong ====
The Motley Fool is a subscription-based private investment analysis company that opened its Hong Kong office about two years ago. Their Hong Kong lead analyst announced that the company would move out of Hong Kong citing "uncertainties" by the national security law and the worsening US-China relationship.

=== 6 October ===
==== Canada accepted Hong Kong refugees fleeing the city seeking asylum ====
Canadian newspaper The Globe and Mail reported that the Immigration and Refugee Board of Canada accepted a Hong Kong couple's application seeking asylum as refugees. The board granted them the status of Convention refugees, a term created by the United Nations Refugee Convention for people who cannot return to their home “due to a well-founded fear of persecution based on race, religion, political opinion” or other factors." Days later, Chinese ambassador Cong Peiwu to Canada warned the Canadian government to not accept Hong Kong activists as refugees. In a video conference Cong stated that “if the Canadian side really cares about the stability and the prosperity in Hong Kong, and really cares about the good health and safety of those 300,000 Canadian passport-holders in Hong Kong, and the large number of Canadian companies operating in Hong Kong SAR, Canada should support those efforts to fight violent crimes” and should not accept "violent criminals" from Hong Kong.

==== Hong Kong primary school teacher fired for asking "what is freedom of speech?" ====
Although there have been several university professors and lecturers fired or see their contracts not renewed based on their pro-democracy stance, this is the first time a primary school teacher's teaching job was lost and license deregistered since the anti-extradition protests began in 2019. A Hong Kong primary school teacher was fired over a worksheet he designed that asked students to think about the meaning of free speech in relations to freedom of expression. The firing happened in late September 2020, with the announcement made by the Education Bureau on 5 October. The first and last question on the worksheets were translated by Hong Kong Free Press from Chinese as: "In your opinion, what is freedom of speech?" and “What will become of Hong Kong without freedom of speech?”, while a further question was translated by The Guardian as "[A]ccording to the video [that the students had been urged to watch], what is the reason for advocating Hong Kong independence?”. The incident happened in September 2019, and after several months of investigation the school – Alliance Primary School – came to a conclusion that the teacher was not spreading pro-independence messages to students but merely asking students to think. However, the Education Bureau's own investigation led to an opposite conclusion. At a press conference on 6 October, Education secretary Kevin Yeung defended the move, referring indirectly to the teacher as "bad apple" – as did Chief Executive Carrie Lam the same day – and calling the firing a way to protect students.

==== International response: United Nations ====
In a call at the United Nations, 39 countries urged China to respect human rights of the Uyghurs and in Tibet, and also expressed grave concerns about the developments in Hong Kong. In response, China and 55 other countries jointly denied such accusation, calling the west interfering with China's internal affairs.

=== 7 October ===
==== Cellebrite will halt relationship with Hong Kong and China authorities ====
Israel cellphone data extraction company Cellebrite stated in an October 7 press release that while the company "empowers law enforcement agencies and enterprises to make our communities safer by providing solutions that help lawfully acquire digital evidence in criminal investigations and civil proceedings," it will stop its service with Hong Kong Police and Chinese authorities as "a result of a change in U.S. regulations" and "to ensure we operate according to accepted international rules and regulations”. In July, 37 human rights activists along with Israeli Defense Ministry and Economy Ministry had joined forces with Joshua Wong to block Cellebrite from exporting this technology to Hong Kong authorities after it was revealed in Hong Kon court documents that Hong Kong Police used the technology to "inflict terror on the city residents." by hacking into at least 4000 arrested pro-democracy activists' phone records.

==== Hong Kong no longer eligible to US green card lottery ====
The USA's 2022 green card lottery program, also known as Diversity Visa program, has now excluded Hong Kong-born individuals from applying for a chance to emigrate to the US while Macau SAR and Taiwan residents continued to be exempted from the ban. Hong Kong has always been treated as its own independent region and has always been eligible since the program began in 1995, but China has never been eligible from the start.

=== 10 October ===
==== Police arrested nine for their alleged involvement in attempted 23 August escape to Taiwan ====
Hong Kong police arrested nine individuals for their alleged assistance to the attempted escape of twelve Hongkongers to Taiwan, including but not limited to roles such as "ownership of the boat, financial backing, providing accommodation before the trip, transportation to the pier and arranging their lives after arriving in Taiwan".

==== Protest-related photo-journalism award ====
Established in 1994, the Bayeux-Calvados-Normandy Awards recognize war correspondents on conflicts in defense of freedoms and democracy. AFP News journalist Anthony Wallace won this year's Bayeux Calvados' Public's Choice Award for his work series titled "Hong Kong: A Popular Revolt" (Hong Kong, une révolte populaire) capturing scenes of the months-long Hong Kong pro-democracy protests. One of the winning photos, also named "AFP Picture of the Year", was taken on September 13, 2019, when thousands of Hong Kong citizens celebrated mid-autumn festival by lighting up their cellphones along the symbolic Lion Rock trail with a "Free HK" neon-light sign at the summit. In addition to winning the Public's Choice Award, the same series of photographs by Wallace also received second place of the Photo Trophy grand prize.

=== 12 October ===
==== International response: USA ====
US State department over Twitter criticized Hong Kong authorities' arrest of the nine individuals on 10 August, calling for Hong Kong government to "work to secure the return of due process rights, not make new arrests". On the other hand, today marked the 51st day since the capture and Hong Kong Chief Executive Carrie Lam made clear that she "no longer wish[es] to discuss matters related to these 12 individuals" when asked by a journalist in today's press conference about her effort to safeguard the 12 individuals. Lam is set to meet with Chinese Communist Party general secretary Xi Jinping in Shenzhen.

==== Italian politician stages 12-day hunger strike in solidarity with the 12 Hong Kong detainees ====
Italian pro-democracy political group Radicali Italiani has organized a 12-day event throughout Italy to bring awareness of the 12 Hong Kong residents captured by Chinese coastguards for over 50 days and incommunicado. In addition, a member of the group will begin a 12-day hunger strike to protest against the detainment.

=== 13 October ===
==== National security law effect: Hong Kong's internet freedom ====
"Freedom On The Net" is an annual publication by the American non-profit Freedom House that rates each country's internet and speech freedom. The rating is based on three criteria: obstacle to access, limits on content, and violations of user rights. Mainland China was ranked worst in internet freedom for the sixth time in a row. The report put Hong Kong together with Turkey, Russia, and Vietnam that have a less open internet due to how the "Beijing-imposed National Security Law threatens to extend the Great Firewall into the region."

==== Hong Kong protesters earned this year's International Republican Institute freedom award ====
Along with Belarus pro-democracy protesters, Hong Kong pro-democracy protesters were awarded this year's International Republic Institute (IRI)'s John S. McCain Freedom Award. US State Secretary Michael Pompeo further defended the 12 Hong Kong residents in the virtual award speech who "committed no crime" but were detained by China while allegedly fleeing Hong Kong for Taiwan. Hong Kong pro-democracy activist Nathan Law praised IRI for its continued support for Hong Kong's political freedom, and called upon all freedom-loving countries to resist Chinese authoritarianism.

=== 14 October ===
==== National security law effect: Over 100 scholars condemn NSL as an "assault" on academic freedom ====
Over 100 academics from over 16 countries signed an online joint statement to increase international political pressure on China regarding the national security law. The statement singled out Article 38 of the law, which it saw as making the law "global in its application". It said further that the law was "compromis[ing] freedom of speech and academic autonomy", and subjecting academics and students to potential surveillance through "weaponising" students for the purpose of informing Chinese authorities on potential violations. The statement called for "a united front of university leaders and academics, Members of Parliament, and senior government officials to act in defense of academic autonomy and freedom of speech".

==== International response: USA ====
On 7 August 2020, Executive Order 13936 of the United States came into effect, which sanctioned 10 China and Hong Kong officials "whose actions have undermined freedoms of assembly, speech, press, or the rule of law, or whose actions have reduced the high degree of autonomy of Hong Kong". Today, the State Department submitted a report to the US Congress to further the details of the US Hong Kong Autonomy Act. The same 10 individuals were listed as individuals who are "materially contributing to, have materially contributed to, or attempt to materially contribute to the failure of China to meet its obligations under the Joint Declaration or the Basic Law". This report also warned financial institutions to sever ties with these 10 individuals. The Hong Kong government dismissed the sanction and stated that these banks in Hong Kong will continue to operate normally despite the US threat.

=== 16 October ===
==== National security law effect: Finland suspended extradition agreement with Hong Kong ====
Sauli Niinistö, President of Finland, formally approved the suspension of the extradition agreement between Finland and Hong Kong, citing increased Chinese interference and the ambiguous legal status of the national security law. Finnish Minister of Justice Anna-Maja Henriksson and Foreign Minister Pekka Haavisto have informally suspended Finland-Hong Kong extradition treaty in July after Hong Kong's national security law came into effect. Final announcement will be made on Monday. Chinese government, not Hong Kong government, objected strongly of Finland's treaty suspension and denounced that an interference of China's internal affairs.

=== 21 October ===
==== Hong Kong government officials meet German Consul General to express dissatisfaction over asylum granted to protester ====
In a meeting with German Consul General Dieter Lamlé, Chief Secretary Matthew Cheung and Secretary for Security John Lee expressed, according to a statement by a government spokesperson, their "stern opposition" to Germany having granted a three-year refuge status to an unidentified CUHK female student on 14 October. The student had been charged with rioting in connection to the protests, skipped bail, and fled to Germany in November 2019. Cheung was quoted as saying that the Hong Kong government "strongly objects to the harbouring of criminals under different pretexts by other jurisdictions," that the Hong Kong legal system would guarantee an open and fair trial, and that Germany should “stop interfering with Hong Kong affairs, which are internal matters within the People’s Republic of China.”

==== Protest-related award: Beazley Designs of the Year ====
The brick roadblocks, also called "mini-stonehenges", were invented and designed by Hong Kong protesters in November 2019 to counter riot police vehicles. This design received this year's London Design Museum Beazley Design of the Year award in the Transport category.

=== 22 October ===
==== New British BN(O) visa immigration route to open from January 2021 ====
The British government announced that the new immigration route for British National (Overseas) citizens from Hong Kong would be open for applications on 31 January 2021.

=== 23 October ===
==== National security law effect: Ireland suspends extradition treaty with Hong Kong ====
Ireland suspends its extradition treaty with Hong Kong explicitly due to the enactment of the Hong Kong national security law by Beijing. Ireland's Foreign Minister Simon Coveney said the decision reviewed by Foreign Affairs and Justice and Equality departments, “clearly signals Ireland's concerns in relation to the rule of law in Hong Kong and the erosion of judicial independence promised under the 'one country, two systems' principle.”

==== UK Members of the Parliament urged "diplomatic priority" on the 12 detainees ====
Over 60 UK Parliament members across political spectrum urged UK Foreign Minister Dominic Raab to demand immediate release of the 12 Hong Kong activists captured by China coastguards on August 23 as a "simple matter of natural justice".

=== 27 October ===
==== Arrest of former Studentlocalism members ====
Student activist Tony Chung was arrested by the Hong Kong police national security unit outside the U.S. Consulate General in Hong Kong, allegedly when Chung was attempting to seek asylum at the consulate. In the afternoon on the same day, two other former members of Studentlocalism William Chan and Yanni Ho were also taken into custody by the police. According to Studentlocalism, Ho and Chan were released on bail on 28 October. Ho was released unconditionally, with her bail money returned, on 18 January 2021.

=== 29 October ===
==== NBC News investigation on anti-Hunter Biden misinformation from Apple Daily ====
In September and October 2020, the pro-Donald Trump newspaper Apple Daily published a factually inaccurate 64-page report produced by Typhoon Investigations falsely alleging former president Joe Biden's son Hunter had a "problematic" connection with the Chinese Communist Party, which was widely cited by far-right influencers such as Steve Bannon and fellow anti-China activist Guo Wengui. A report by NBC News linked the Typhoon Investigations to a fake "intelligence firm" and claimed that the author of the document, a self-identified Swiss security analyst named Martin Aspen, was a "fabricated identity". The original poster of the document, Christopher Balding, admitted that he wrote parts of the document and later stated that the document had been commissioned by Apple Daily. The paper's owner, prominent Trump supporter Jimmy Lai, later said that he had personally "nothing to do with" the report. But, he admitted his senior executive, Mark Simon, had "worked with the project". Simon resigned following the NBC report and apologised for having "allowed damage to Jimmy on a matter he was completely in the dark on".

Before NBC's investigative report, the paper had been publishing pro-Trump misinformation during the 2020 United States presidential election, which was believed to relate to the former and current president's anti-Chinese xenophobia. In an opinion piece, it falsely claimed that "a vote for Trump is not only for the Americans' own interests, but it is also one that is for the survival of the free world"; in another commentary, it misleadingly criticized the Democratic Party and a "leftist ideology permeated in Western academia and journalism". Although the position of the newspaper and Jimmy Lai was echoed by many democracy activists in Hong Kong, Taiwan and exiled Chinese dissidents living in the United States, democracy experts in the US like University of Kentucky professor Sharon Yam and Los Angeles-based AAPI activist and writer Promise Li considered these views problematic for the pro-democracy movement and agreed that they not only benefitted the mainland Chinese government, but were also instrumental in the organization of the January 6 United States Capitol attack.
