= Timeline of the 2019–2020 Hong Kong protests =

The following is a month by month timeline of the 2019–2020 Hong Kong protests.

== Timeline ==
Month(s)	Number of protests	Number of counter protests	Major events
March–June 2019	11	4	12 June 2019 Hong Kong protest
July	16	5	Storming of the Legislative Council Complex
August	31	11	Hong Kong Way
September	20	2	
October	22	1	
November	26	N/A	Death of Chow Tsz-lok, Siege of the Chinese University of Hong Kong, Siege of the Hong Kong Polytechnic University, 2019 Hong Kong local elections
December	22	3	
January 2020	27	3	
February	12	N/A	
March	6	1	
April	8	N/A	
May	5	N/A	
June	1	N/A	Unauthorized protest on occasion of the 31st anniversary of the 1989 Tiananmen Square protests and massacre
July	0	N/A	
August	0	N/A	
September	1	N/A	Unauthorized protests on 6 September, the original date of the postponed legislative election
October	0	N/A	
