= Timeline of the 2019–2020 Hong Kong protests (February 2020) =

February events of the 2019–2020 pro-democracy demonstrations in Hong Kong

Timeline of the 2019–2020 Hong Kong protests
2019			March–June				July	August	September	October	November	December
2020	January	February	March	April	May	June	July	August	September	October	November	December
2021	January	February	March	April	May	June	July	August	September–November			December

In late January 2020, the COVID-19 pandemic started to gain more concerns from the public due to its severity. In early February, consequently, the organizers announced to suspend the demonstrations. Alternatively, protests over responses to the outbreak were held in various districts. The largest demonstrations besides the outbreak protests were to commemorate the July 21 Yuen Long attack and August 31 Prince Edward station attack, as well as the death of Chow Tsz-lok and Chan Yin-lam.

== Events ==
=== 3 February ===
At noon, more than a hundred people gathered in the Central International Financial Center to participate in the "Lunch with You" event, and shouted "Support for medical strikes", "Seal customs, the only way out" and more. Some participants gave white ribbons to passersby, and some students participated in the event with "full gear".

=== 4 February ===
Some citizens launched "Lunch with you" in Central to support the strike by medical care staff. They also urged the government to complete a comprehensive customs clearance as soon as possible, and respond to the five major civil demands, which includes setting up an independent investigative committee to thoroughly investigate the alleged police violence.

=== 7 February ===
During the night, the Hong Kong Alliance in Support of Patriotic Democratic Movements in China held a memorial for Li Wenliang in Chater Garden, in Central, to commemorate the "whistleblower" of the Wuhan epidemic, and hoped to let those in power know the support of Hong Kong citizens for free speech by also whistleblowing.

=== 8 February ===
Chow Tsz-lok died three months ago. To commemorate his death more than 100 citizens went to the parking lot of Sheung Tak Estate to mourn. At the same time, the general clinic at Po Ning Road, Tseung Kwan O, became the designated clinic for the treatment of coronavirus. Residents from many districts objected to this. The citizens gathered in Pui Shing Garden (培成花園) and started to march through Tseung Kwan O Sports Ground to Sheung Tak Estate. At 9 pm, someone started to block the road with bicycles and other items outside the Sheung Tak shopping mall. Afterwards, a private car carrying a number of plainclothes police officers rushed and chased the protesters. A few riot police also arrived and more than 60 people were arrested. The arrested including multiple journalists and district councillors. During the period, many journalists and citizens were fired at with pepper spray.

=== 14 February: Valentine's Day ===
The League of Social Democrats initiated a march to Lai Chi Kok Reception Centre, in solidarity with demonstrators that had been imprisoned in the protests. At 8 pm, more than 500 people responded to the call and went outside the Lai Chi Kok Reception Centre to participate in a "Hands and Feet, [we] spend Valentine's Day with you" event. (The expression "Hands and Feet" signified fellow protesters.) Many people wrote their slogans or postcards, and some holding a banner calling for independence of Hong Kong. The group shouted slogans such as "I love you", "Release the righteous and restore my righteousness", "Hong Kong independence, the only way out" and more. The event ended at 9:30. Some officers in the uniform called for the people to leave. Nearly at 10 pm, the riot police arrived to raise the blue flag to warn and expel the participants. The protesters then put flower pots, trash, furnishings barricades on the road outside the Lai Chi Kok Reception Centre, riot police and Athlon squad officers arrived to clean up.

=== 19 February ===
==== Lunch with You ====
At about 1 pm, more than 10 citizens gathered in the IFC Mall, in Central, for a "Lunch with You" rally. Protesters held banners and shouted slogans, some started singing. Before 1:40, the number of participants increased to about 50. After 1:40, the crowd stepped out of the mall and walked along a nearby footbridge. The crowd continued stopped at the footbridge outside the Exchange Square, shouting a slogan. By 2 pm, the event was over and the crowd dispersed peacefully.

==== Citizen Square Flowing Rally ====
The civil servants' union will launch a "flowing assembly" at the Citizens Plaza, Central Government Headquarters. They held a banner to thank medical staff and slogan "Hong Kong people save themselves". During the rally, some citizens walked to the gate of the government headquarters and put up a sign saying "Civil servants fight the epidemic, the government released the epidemic", expressing their dissatisfaction with the government's ineffectiveness in fighting the Coronavirus. At about 7 pm the rally ended and no conflicts occurred. About 1,000 people attended the rally.

==== Five-month anniversary of the death of Chan Yin-lam ====
Some citizens initiated a memorial service for Chan Yin-lam on the ground floor of the parking lot in Sheung Tak Village, Tseung Kwan O at night. By 8 pm, about 70 people came to mourn. The wall at the base of the parking lot was covered with her pictures, and some pictures of Chow Tsz-lok. The participants lit white candles and placed flowers in front of the photos of the two. Many participants stood silent beside the road. At about 9 pm, the people observed a minute of silence for the deceased.

=== 21 February ===
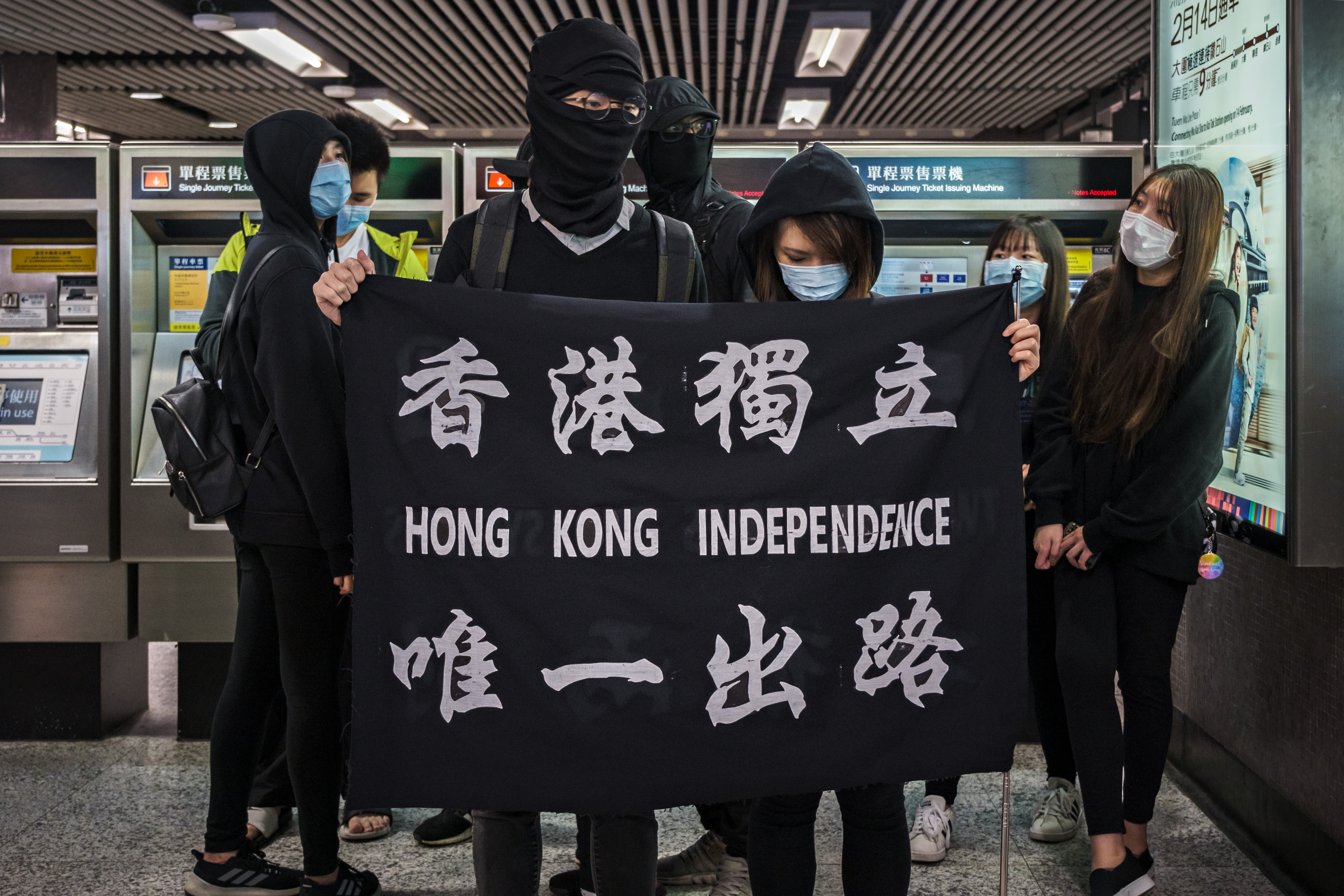
Protesters calling for Hong Kong independence

==== Multi-zone Lunch with You ====
Some citizens launched "Lunch with You" protests in multiple districts, calling on citizens to fight the Coronavirus while not forgetting the 2019 Yuen Long attack. In response to news of a police officer having been diagnosed with the virus, citizens in all districts brought champagne or beer, and said the slogan "The Most Important People Are Something". In addition, outside Causeway Bay Times Square, more than 20 pro-government supporters held Chinese and Hong Kong flags, and played the national anthem. This caused dissatisfaction among the anti-government protesters present, and the two sides broke out in a clash and some people were injured. Police arrested one man and two women in a fight and hunted down another middle-aged man involved in the case. The injured were sent to hospital for treatment.

Citizens also gathered outside the Hong Kong Industrial Centre in Cheung Sha Wan and Kwai Chung. Police officers intercepted the gathering. In addition, at 1 pm, a group of young people opened champagne outside the AIA Kowloon Building on How Ming Street, Kwun Tong. Dozens of people in black were intercepted by the police. About 50 citizens gathered at the CIC Zero Carbon Building in Kowloon Bay. Police officers seized a torch-type stick and telescopic stick on a 25-year-old man and arrested him for possession of offensive weapons.

==== Seven-month anniversary of the Yuen Long attack ====
For the seven month anniversary for the Yuen Long attack, a large number of citizens responded to online calls to assemble at Yuen Long and Causeway Bay Station and Ma On Shan Station. The MTR closed the West Rail Yuen Long Station early at 5 pm. At about 7 pm, nearly 100 citizens gathered at the atrium of the Yoho Mall, the number of participants increased to about 300. Most of the protesters sat on the ground, shouting slogans such as "no-show 7.21, killing on 8.31, gunned down on 10.1", "dissolve the police force, urgently" and other slogans. They displayed a banner reading "recovering the revolution in the Hong Kong era". Another citizen opened champagne and raised a glass to celebrate a police officer diagnosed with pneumonia in Wuhan. He shouted: "Black police died of pneumonia!". By 8 pm, more than 100 riot police arrived at the exit of the underground bus stop of the mall. A large number of citizens left after learning the news, the scene was chaotic. Yuen Long District Councillor Ng Kin-wai, after communicating with the riot police, said the police would have the opportunity to enter the mall.

By 10 pm, many citizens were intercepted by riot police when they left the exit of the underground bus station. At 11:00 pm, some people blocked the road with plastic boxes and garbage on the main road in Yuen Long, and the riot police came to the scene to clean up.

At the Causeway Bay MTR station, there were also nearly 200 citizens sitting quietly. Some participating females knelt down and paid tribute to other protesters. Some people also accused the police of being more wanton after 7.21 and vowed to investigate the police. A large number of plainclothes and riot police are on alert near the different exits of Causeway Bay Station. At about 9 pm, people who participated in the meditation continued to disperse.

=== 24 February ===
In the evening, during the reconstruction of the Lennon Wall on the footbridge connecting Kwai Chung Village and Kwai Chung Shopping Centre by 15 young protesters, more than 20 uniformed police officers came to the scene to intercept and arrest them. About 20 additional riot police officers arrived later. Police officers said they arrested the protesters on suspicion of criminal damage. Kwai Tsing District Councillor Leung Kam-wai argued that it was unreasonable for the police to arrest the protesters and that their behavior with by passers was unprofessional.

=== 29 February ===
For the seven month anniversary of the Prince Edward station attack many protesters marched around Mong Kok and Prince Edward despite the coronavirus outbreak in Hong Kong. The demonstration was violent being described as 'a night of chaos' by the South China Morning Post, with protesters throwing petrol bombs and bricks at police officers with the police firing tear gas back. An officer drew his gun on protesters by the intersection of Nathan Road and Nelson Street, after the protesters started throwing bricks and bamboo poles at him. The officer sustained injuries to his head and limbs but did not open fire. A police officer was accused of pepper-spraying passersby for no apparent reason and another of punching a man who was standing on the street.

Police officers arrested 71 men and 44 women, aged 15 to 54, for suspicion of taking part in unauthorised assemblies, possession of offensive weapons and instruments fit for unlawful purpose, arson, attacking police officers and obstructing police. Finance Secretary Paul Chan Mo-po warned of further harm to an economy if violent demonstrations continued stating “The blocking of the roads and the use of petrol bombs in Mong Kok [on Saturday] was worrying,” and “If the violent clashes continue, that would harm citizens’ safety, hurt consumer sentiment and affect businesses.”.

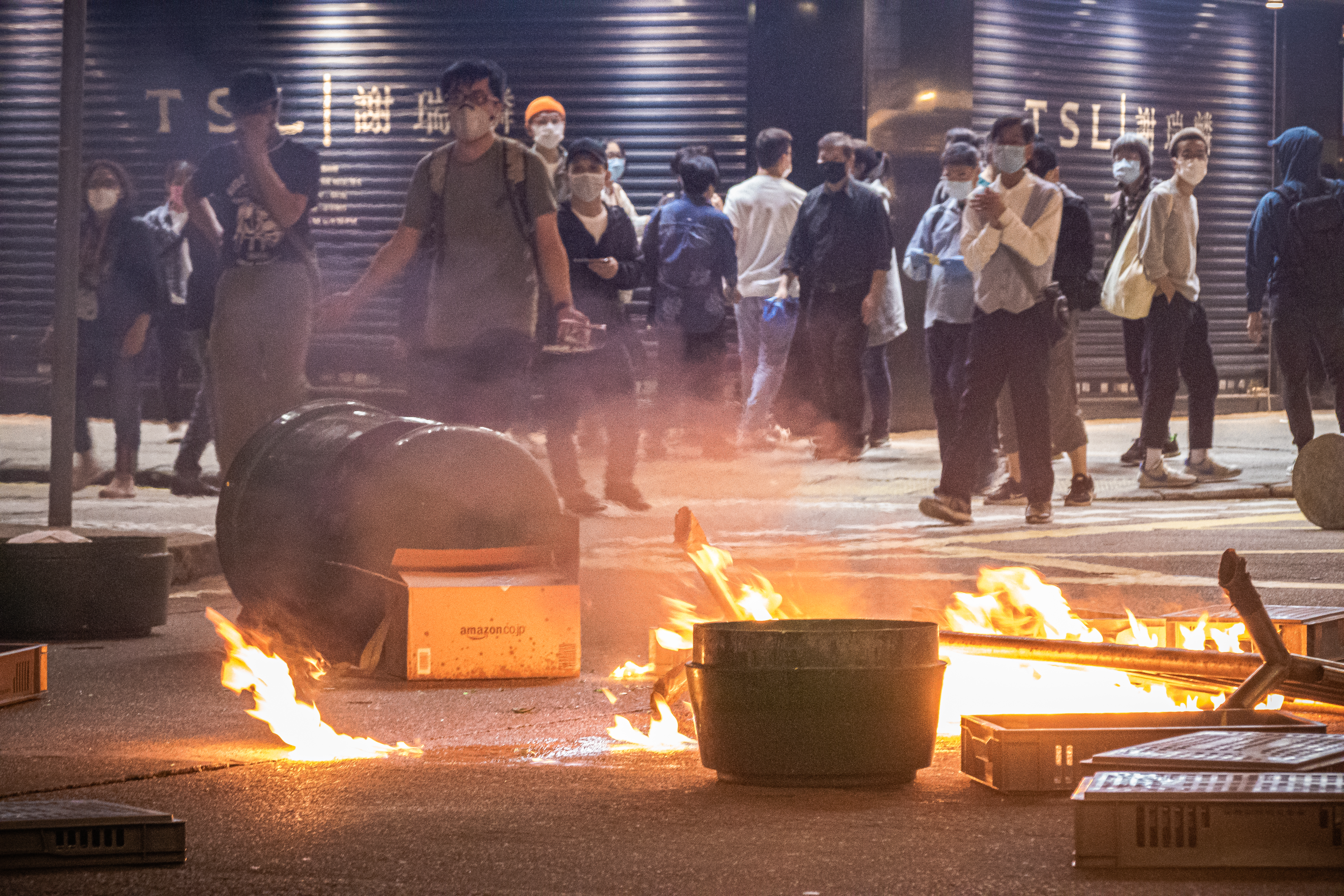
Objects being set on fire in the middle of the road

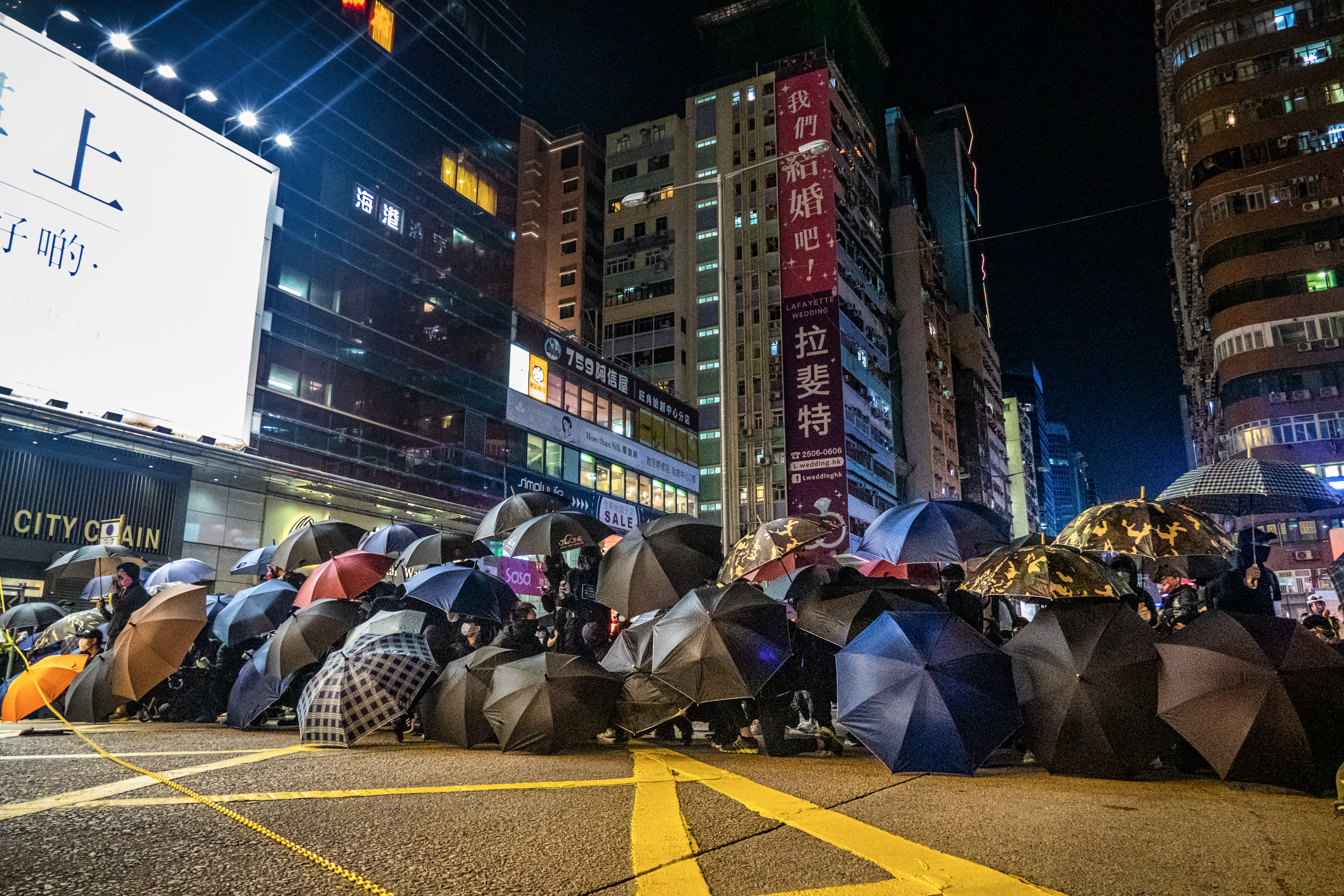
Protesters using umbrellas

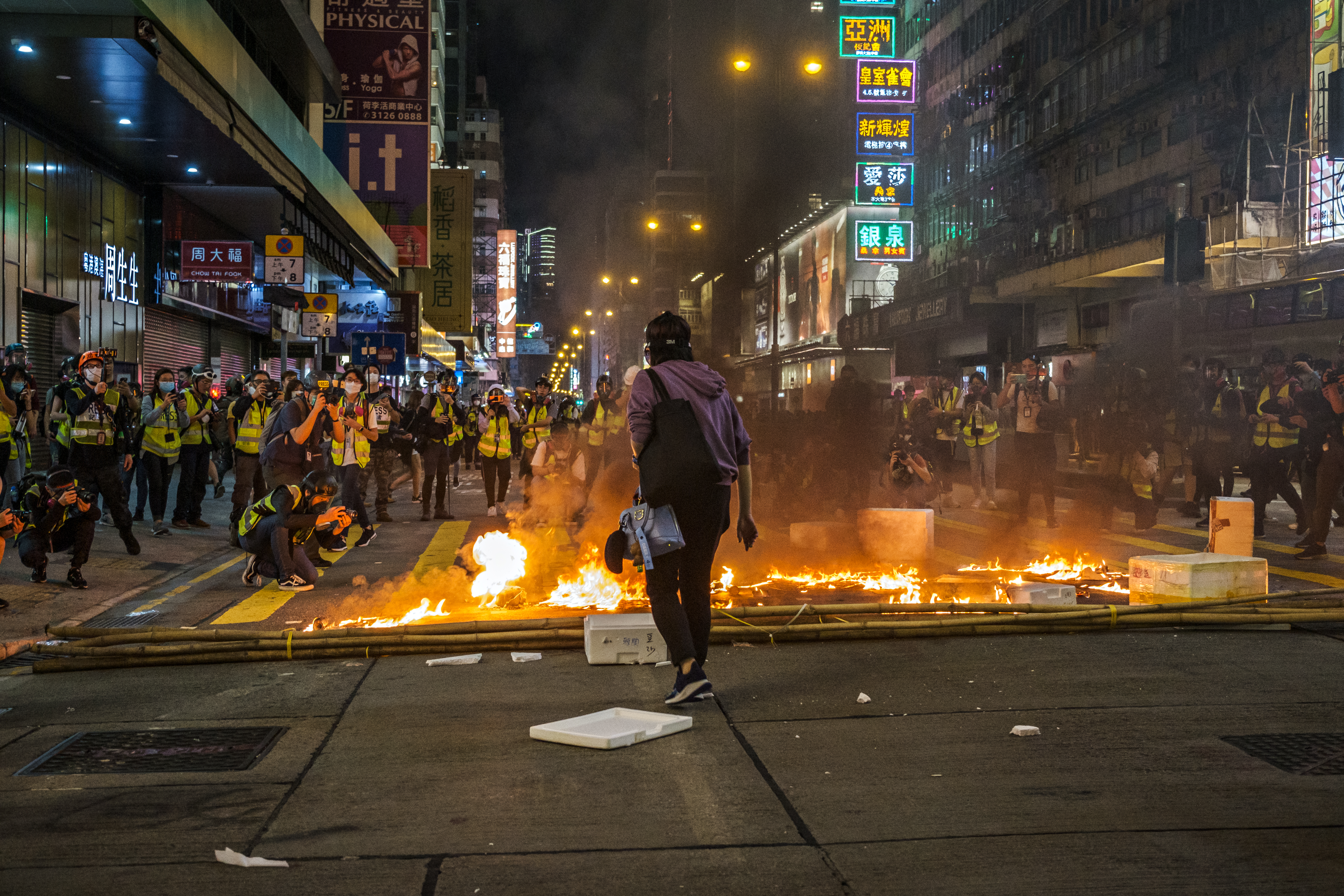
Bamboo set on fire to create a roadblock

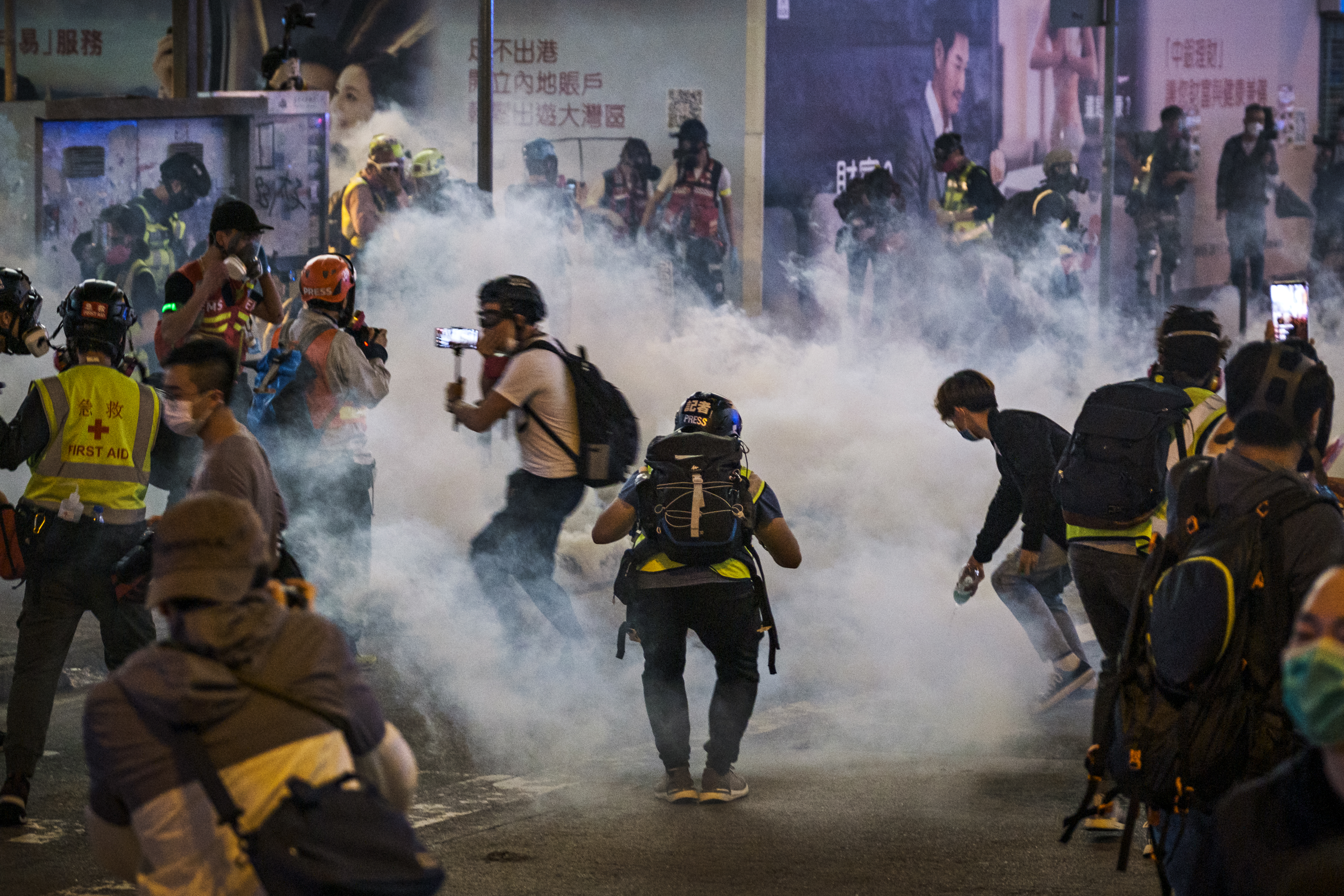
Tear gas was used by police

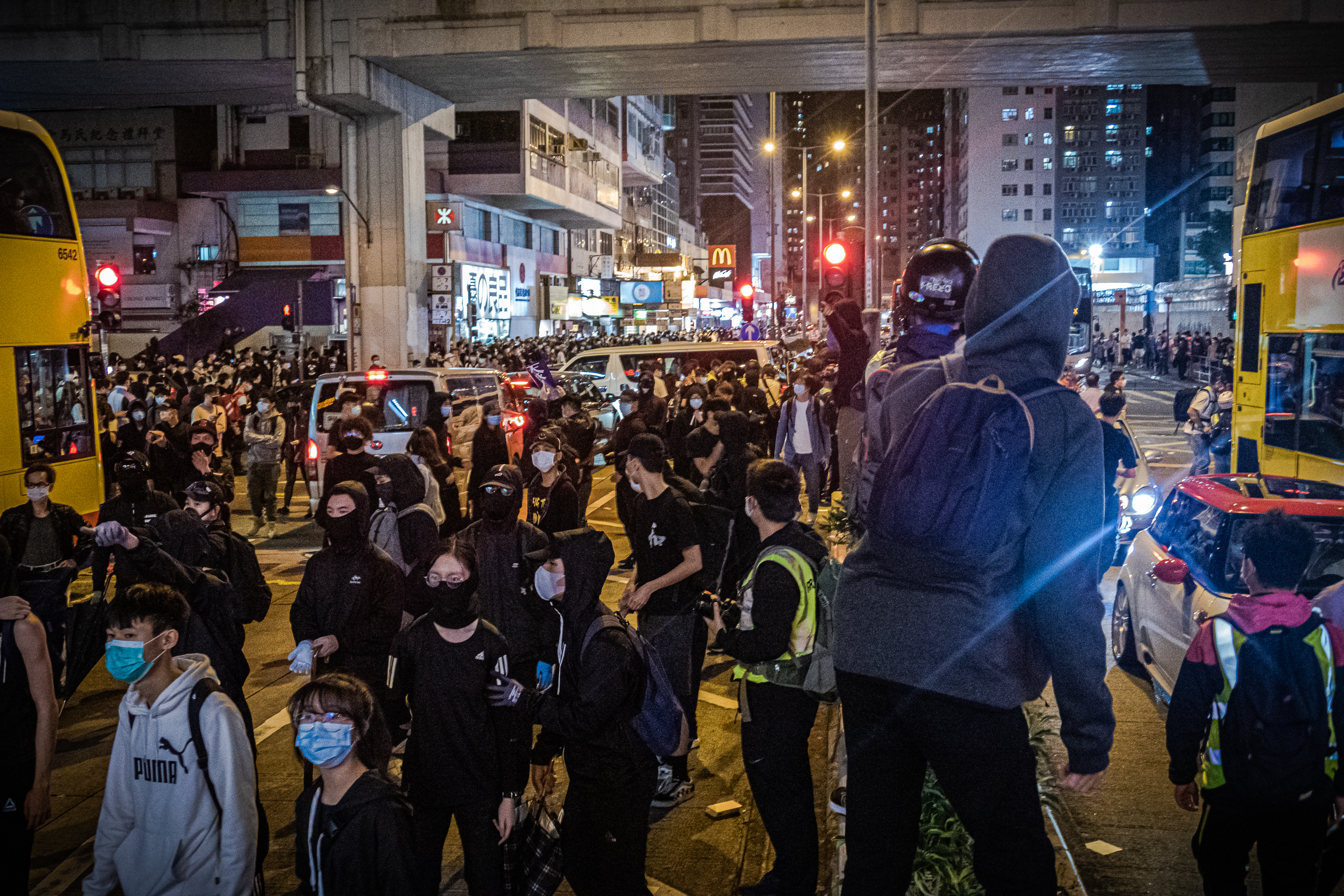
Protesters in the street
