= Death of Luo Changqing =

2019 death during the Hong Kong protests

Luo Changqing
- Luo Changqing, shortly after having gotten struck in the head by a brick and falling backwards
- Traditional Chinese: 羅長清
- Simplified Chinese: 罗长清
Transcriptions
Standard Mandarin
- Hanyu Pinyin: Luó Chǎngqīng
Yue: Cantonese
- Jyutping: Lo^{4} Coeng^{4}cing^{1}

Luo Changqing, a 70-year-old Hong Kong cleaner, died from head injuries sustained after he was hit by a brick thrown by a Hong Kong protester during a violent confrontation between two groups in Sheung Shui, Hong Kong on 13 November 2019. Following his injuries, he was taken to Prince of Wales Hospital, Sha Tin, where he died the next day. This incident is described as the sole fatality directly attributed to the Hong Kong protests that began in 2019.

== Victim ==
The victim was identified as Luo Changqing, a 70-year-old man, who worked as a government-contracted cleaner. He was an outsourced worker of the Food and Environmental Hygiene Department. The police found that Luo had no political background or inclination and was not a member of any organisation. The Federation of Hong Kong Shenzhen Associations said that he was born and raised in Hong Kong.

== Incident ==
External videos
- The 13 November Sheung Shui clash, including the fatal throw (SCMP)
- The moment of the fatal throw, zoomed in and slowed down (CCTV)

On 13 November 2019, a conflict between opposing groups took place on Lung Wan Street, outside the North District Town Hall, in Sheung Shui. Around noon, several people were trying to clear bricks left by protesters on the street. They were described by media outlets as residents of Sheung Shui or government supporters. However, a group of protesters appeared and argued with the group who were clearing bricks, after which the violent confrontation between the two sides erupted. During this encounter, the protesters left after a few minutes of arguing and then came back with a group of about 30 protesters.

The fight between the two groups broke out at 11.52 am. It involved members of both sides hurling bricks at each other. The protesters were dressed in black, wore masks over their faces, and carried umbrellas used as protection during the fight. The incident lasted for about a minute, after which the protesters retreated under the shelter of their umbrellas.

Luo was part of the group who were clearing the street. Before the incident, he was helping to clear the street. The location was about 300 metres away from his workplace. He was on his lunch break at the time. During the confrontation, he was using his mobile phone to record the conflict. He did not participate in the brick throwing.

Luo was hit by a brick thrown by one of the black-clad protesters. He lost consciousness after he was hit and did not regain it before he died. He was transported to the North District Hospital and then transferred to the Prince of Wales Hospital, where he was admitted to the neurosurgery high-dependency unit. Luo's family arrived from mainland China, after which the Hong Kong Police Force escorted them to Luo who was then still unconscious at the Prince of Wales Hospital.

Luo died at the Prince of Wales Hospital. The time of death was 10:51 pm on 14 November 2019, the day after he was struck. The cause of death was a brainstem hemorrhage resulting from the head trauma. His death is described as the first and only fatality directly attributed to the Hong Kong protests that began in 2019.

== Aftermath ==
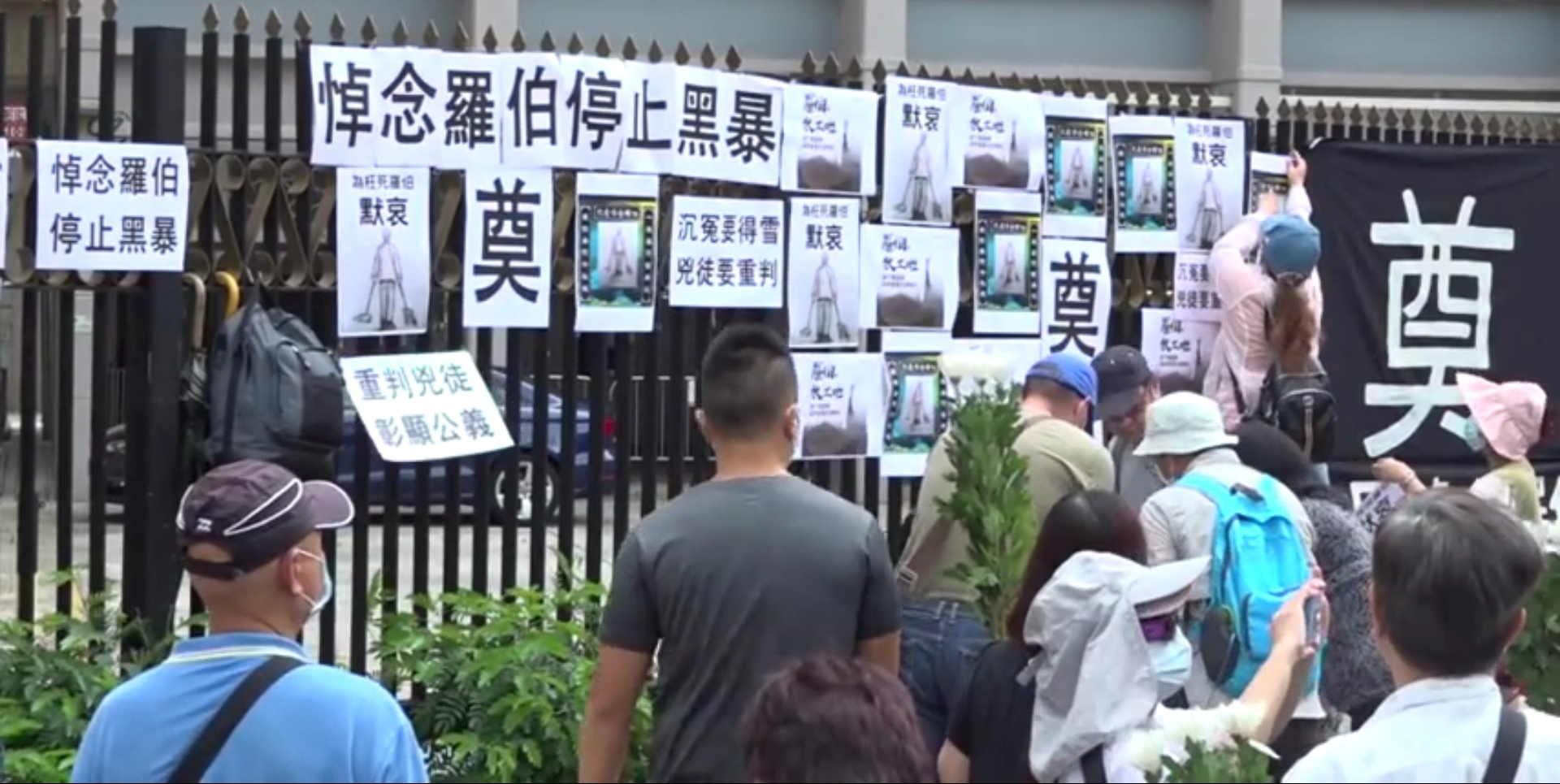
Memorial to Luo Changqing near the site of the incident

An area near where Luo Changqing was killed, outside the North District Town Hall, became a memorial to him. On 15 November 2019, a public vigil for Luo was held at the site. However, a few days later, the memorial site was vandalised by unknown perpetrators.

On 22 November, members of Luo's family went to the site to mourn him. They initially wanted to remain anonymous, citing concern for their personal safety, but eventually went public, guided by the Hong Kong Federation of Trade Unions (HKFTU). Luo's funeral was held on the same day. His relatives said that he would be buried on a family plot in mainland China. The HKFTU said that, at the family's request, Luo would be buried next to his father in Hunan.

Over one hundred thousand people from mainland China, including Chinese actor Huang Xiaoming, donated funds set up in support of the families of Luo and a 57-year-old man named Lee Chi-cheung who was set on fire during an argument with protesters. Hong Kong businessman and former legislator Kennedy Wong (Wong Ying-ho), who co-founded a fund in support of citizens and small and medium-sized enterprises affected by the unrest, announced that they would look at how their fund could be used to help Luo's family.

== Responses ==
The Hong Kong Government said in a statement that they were saddened by the incident and that the police would work to bring the offenders to justice. The Food and Environmental Hygiene Department released a statement, expressing profound sadness at the passing of its service worker and saying it was providing assistance to his family. The Secretary for Food and Health Sophia Chan (Chan Siu-chee) said in a statement that "I am deeply saddened and extend my condolences to the family."

The Citizens' Press Conference representing the protesters released a statement expressing their "extreme condolences" at the death of the old man and said that citizens should not wind up as sacrifices of political struggles regardless of their political viewpoints. "Only by solving the political issue through political means", the conference continued in the statement, "could the Hong Kong communist regime settle the conflicts and uncertainties, and end the needless sacrifices and tragedies."

The Hong Kong Liaison Office expressed its "deep condolences" and urged the Hong Kong people to "denounce violence and protect the rule of law and stability of society together." They reiterated their support for the Hong Kong government and police force, urging them to punish the culprits sternly in accordance to the law. The office characterised the attack as "an atrocity against humanity that was totally inhumane and unforgivable." In a commentary in the Chinese state-owned news agency Xinhua, this fatal incident was cited as one of the examples highlighting the violence perpetrated by "black-clad rioters" besetting Hong Kong's society.

== Investigation ==
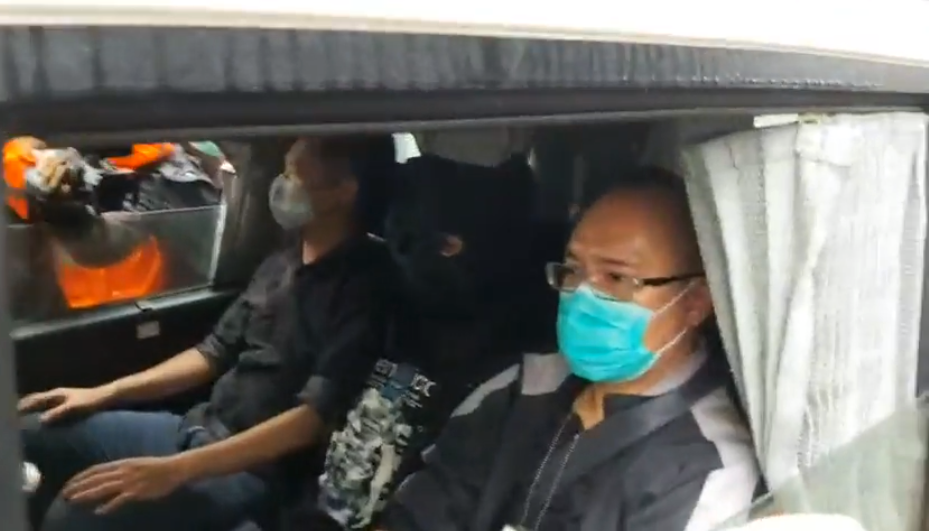
The person seated in the middle is one of two escorted to face the charge of murder at the Tuen Mun Magistrates' Court on 22 April 2020.

The case was initially classified as a wounding, and assigned to the New Territories North Regional Crime Unit. Following Luo's death, it was upgraded to murder, as the police believed that the attacker had "maliciously" and "deliberately" struck Luo with the brick. The case was referred to the Coroner's Court for follow-up. The police offered an HK$800,000 reward for information on the killer.

After police reviewed CCTV footage and noted that some nearby cameras had been damaged by protesters, Senior Superintendent Chan Tin-chu told reporters that "Those in black first threw metal rods and bricks at the residents while Luo was believed to have used a mobile phone to film the scene. Then someone in black darted forward and threw a brick at his head."

On 13 December 2019, five suspects – three men and two women, aged 15 to 18 – were arrested in Sheung Shui and Tai Po on suspicion of murder, wounding, and participation in a riot, police having identified the suspects after examination of online and CCTV footage of the area. The suspects were detained at New Territories North Regional Headquarters in Tai Po for further inquiry. Police stated that while some of the five threw bricks and wounded certain individuals – one of them, a 16-year-old boy, having hurled bricks at a 61-year-old man whose left retina was damaged – no footage showed any of them directly throwing a brick at the now-deceased man. The five suspects were released on bail.

On 17 June 2020, the police released photographs of 14 other suspects wanted in connection with Luo's death. Senior Inspector Wong Yiu-ming of the New Territories North Regional Crime Unit stated that "We have reasons to believe the 14 suspects are involved in the case," but did not give further details about the suspects or their roles, citing the ongoing legal proceedings.

=== Court case ===
On 22 April 2020, Chan Yin-ting (aged 16) and Lau Tsz-lung (Kelvin Lau, aged 17) appeared at the Tuen Mun Magistrates' Court to face charges of rioting, wounding with intent, and murder in connection with the death of Luo Changqing. The police stated that the two were among six individuals — three male and three female, aged 15 to 18 — arrested in December 2019 in relation to Luo's killing. The case was adjourned for a hearing at the Eastern Magistrates' Court on 1 June 2020 and was subsequently transferred to the High Court.

The two defendants were initially charged with murder as accomplices under the doctrine of joint enterprise, but High Court Judge Esther Toh (Toh Lye-ping) reduced the charge to manslaughter following a review of the prosecution's evidence. The evidence, as ruled by the judge, namely did not establish that the defendants could have foreseen that someone would be killed. The prosecution argued that, although the defendants did not deliver the fatal strike to Luo, they should be held liable for manslaughter under joint enterprise, and were part of a black-clad group that began throwing bricks at another group attempting to clear bricks from the road.

In July 2022, following a jury trial at the High Court, Chan and Lau were acquitted of manslaughter (unanimously) and wounding with intent but convicted of rioting. They were sentenced to five and a half years in jail. Judge Esther Toh stated that the defendants were part of the group that instigated the violence that escalated into a "very serious riot" in which "[t]hings devolved into mayhem which led to very tragic consequences." In contrast, she described the citizens who cleared the roadblocks as "unsung heroes", saying they acted not for personal gain but out of bravery in the spirit of Hong Kong. She set a sentence of six years as a starting point and deducted half a year, because the two lacked proper adult supervision and did not foresee the disastrous consequences of their actions.

== See also ==
- Death of Chow Tsz-lok
- Death of Chan Yin-lam
