= Timeline of the 2019–2020 Hong Kong protests (April 2020) =

April events of the 2019–2020 pro-democracy demonstrations in Hong Kong

Timeline of the 2019–2020 Hong Kong protests
2019			March–June				July	August	September	October	November	December
2020	January	February	March	April	May	June	July	August	September	October	November	December
2021	January	February	March	April	May	June	July	August	September–November			December

This is a timeline of events in April 2020 surrounding the 2019–2020 Hong Kong protests. The COVID-19 pandemic had caused a decline in the number and scale of the protests, although the Hong Kong government, police and protesters expected that with signs of the pandemic beginning to ease in Hong Kong, major protests of the kind the city had seen before the pandemic would again erupt in summer. Most protest-related activities happened online, especially on games like Animal Crossing. This resulted in a ban on the sale of Animal Crossing in China. Hong Kong police arrested 15 Democrats on the morning of 18 April, citing their alleged participation in "unlawful" gatherings that had taken place in August and October 2019 in the context of the protests. This drew international condemnation, with accusations being made that the crackdown had been carried out at the behest of the Chinese central government, and taken advantage of many Western democracies being severely hit by the pandemic, hampering their response.

== Events ==
=== 8 April ===
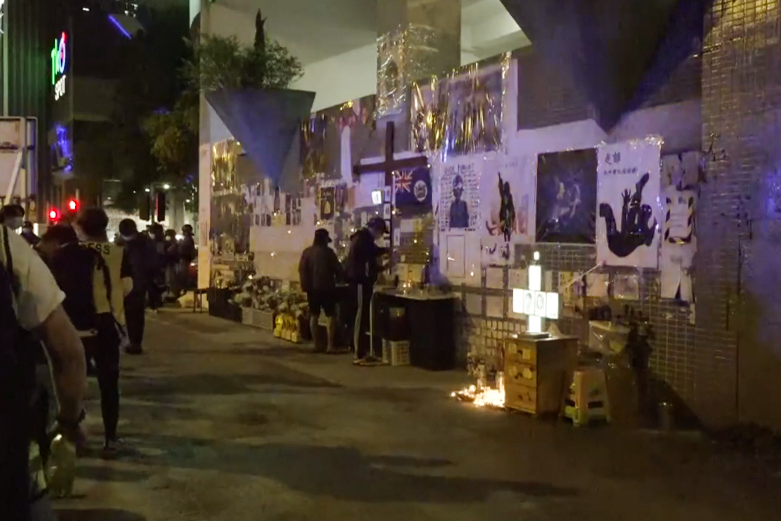
Memorial at the carpark, 8 April

Protesters mourned the death of Chow Tsz-lok, who died in November 2019. A large number of riot police were on patrol at Tseung Kwan O station and the parking lot of Shangde Village at 5:00 pm and observed and photographed the ground conditions at the upper level of the parking lot. Under the "Limitation Order" only a few citizens laid flowers outside the Suntech parking lot. Some citizens were dissatisfied and asked by police officers to leave.

=== 9 April ===
The Court of Appeal ruled that the Hong Kong government's use of the Emergency Regulations Ordinance to formulate the Prohibition on Face Covering Regulation in October 2019 was constitutional. Part of the government's appeal was justified, and the Prohibition on Face Covering Regulation was in effect when protesters assembled illegally or without approval. The two provisions – "Prohibition of masking during legal processions and meetings" and "Police officers have the right to require persons in public places to remove masked items" – remain unconstitutional. In justifying its ruling, the Court of Appeal argued that bystanders or people who had joined a lawful rally would be put at risk if they did not become aware of a rally authorization being revoked while it was held; and that police already had powers to allow identification of suspects without the power to remove face masks.

On 21 December 2020, the Court of Final Appeal reversed the 9 April ruling, with the judgement stating that the mask ban of October 2019 had been proportionate and necessary in view of the "unlawfulness" and "vandalism" prevalent in the 2019 protests.

=== 15 April ===
The head of the liaison office in Hong Kong, Luo Huining, called for the rapid passing of a national security law for the city.

The Tuen Mun Magistrates' Courts sentenced a 21-year-old male barista, who burned and trampled on a Chinese flag outside the Tuen Mun Town Hall during a confrontation in Tuen Mun on 21 September 2019, to a 240-hour social service order. On 10 July 2020, as the result of a review requested by government prosecutors who had argued that the initial sentence had been inadequate, Tuen Mun Court toughened the sentence to five weeks in jail.

=== 18 April ===
Hong Kong police arrested 15 Democrats on the morning of 18 April. Most being current or former legislators were charged with participating in unlawful assemblies in 2019 in connection with the protests.

The arrests attracted the attention of the British and American governments and several international human rights organisations and the media. A total of five organisations including the International Bar Association, the Law Society of England and Wales and the International Commission of Jurists issued a statement indicating their concerns over the arrest of the 15 Democrats. They believed the arrests reflected the continued impact on Hong Kong's freedom of expression and right to protest. Former Governor of Hong Kong Chris Patten criticised this as being against the rule of law and the actions of an authoritarian government. U.S. Secretary of State, Mike Pompeo, issued a statement condemning the arrests as not being in accordance with the Sino-British Joint Declaration. The Speaker of the United States House of Representatives, Nancy Pelosi, said on Twitter that Hong Kong's democracy and human rights continued to be violated, urging the White House to implement the Hong Kong Human Rights and Democracy Act. On 23 April, more than 30 members of the European Parliament issued two co-signed open letters condemning the political prosecution of Hong Kong democrats by the Hong Kong government.

A government spokesman pointed out that the relevant cases had entered the judicial process and no one should make comments about unfounded speculations. An OCMFA spokesperson expressed strong dissatisfaction and firm opposition to the criticism by the European Parliament, referring to the open letter as "hypocrisy and arrogance on the issue of Hong Kong".

List of those arrested.
Political Party	Name	Previous / Current Public Office
Democratic Party	Martin Lee	Former legislator
Democratic Party	Albert Ho	Former legislator
Democratic Party	Yeung Sum	Former legislator
Democratic Party	Sin Chung-kai	Current Kwai Tsing District Council Chairman
Democratic Party	Richard Tsoi	
League of Social Democrats	Leung Kwok-hung	Former legislator
League of Social Democrats	Raphael Wong	
League of Social Democrats	Avery Ng	
Labour Party	Lee Cheuk-yan	Former legislator
Labour Party	Cyd Ho	Former legislator
Civic Party	Margaret Ng	Former legislator
Neighbourhood and Worker's Service Centre	Leung Yiu-chung	Current legislator
Independent	Au Nok-hin	Former legislator
Independent	Jimmy Lai	Founder of Next Digital
Independent	Chen Haohuan	

=== 19 April ===
In an article that appeared in the Ming Pao newspaper, the daughter and friends of an over-50-year-old deceased woman who had suffered from asthma asked the police to disclose the composition of the tear gas that had been used during demonstrations at the Chinese University of Hong Kong. The deceased had been to protests at various locations, including the Chinese University and Polytechnic University, since October 2019. According to witnesses, she wished to protect the younger protesters despite being affected by the tear gas. She was admitted to hospital because of dyspnea, and released later. She died at home on 2 December 2019 due to dyspnea. The police insisted their use of tear gas had been safe.

=== 21 April ===
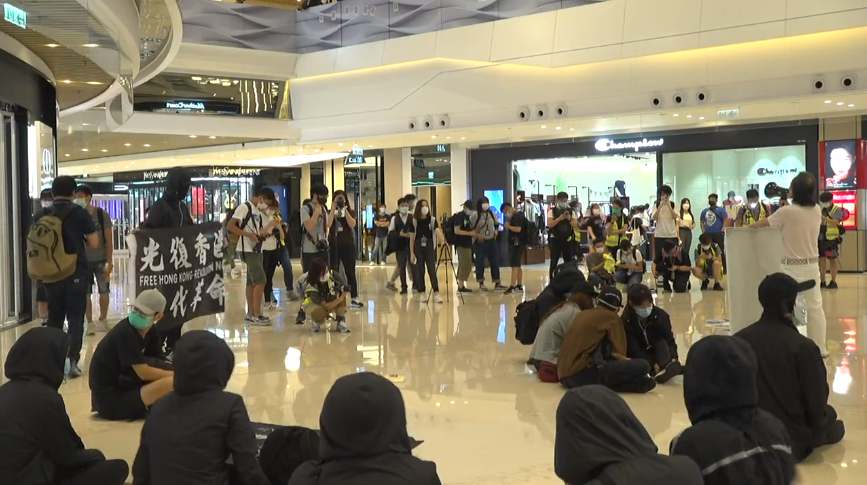
Protesters at the Yoho Mall

At 8:00 pm, more than 20 protesters sat in the atrium of the Yoho Mall and chanted slogans. About 10:00 pm, a large number of riot police officers suddenly rushed onto the footbridge of Castle Peak Road, intercepting a number of citizens passing by. Some riot police officers ordered two citizens to leave, then pepper sprayed them. About 11:00 pm, riot police raised a blue flag warning at Yau San Street and intercepted six people at Fau Tsoi Street. A fixed penalty order was issued with a Restriction Order. Some citizens have indicated they will defend the charges in court. At least two men were arrested.

=== 24 April ===
==== Lunch with You ====
About 1:00 pm, approximately ten protesters launched the "Lunch with You" event in the atrium of the International Financial Center Mall in Central, Hong Kong. They repeatedly chanted: "Glory to Hong Kong, Revolution of the Times", "Five Demands, Not One Less". Affected by the "Position Restriction Order", the participants kept their distance and placed banners on the ground. About 2:00 pm, the protest dispersed peacefully. There were police officers stationed at the overpasses at the exits of the mall and at the entrance of the Exchange Square.

==== Man sentenced to 20 days in prison for humiliating a flag ====
A young man trampled the national flag of the People's Republic of China in a pro-democracy protest in 2019. After pleading guilty, he was initially sentenced to a 200-hour social service order. The Hong Kong government appealed to the Court of Appeal, which changed the sentence to 20 days in prison.

=== 26 April ===
At 6:20 pm, about 300 protesters participated in a "sing with you" activity on multiple floors of the Cityplaza. Many protesters chanted slogans and waved flags. The police dispatched a large number of officers. Officers and police cars were on patrol. By about 6:40 pm, a large number of riot police officers holding shields and pepper spray entered the mall from different locations to disperse the protesters, accusing them of violating the Restriction Order. The police asked people in the mall to leave one by one. About 7:00 pm, riot police with anti-riot guns entered the second floor of the mall from the underground. Chaotic scenes ensued, during which a police officer pointed pepper spray at a reporter. Police officers later pulled up the cordon, and some people were stopped and searched outside the mall. About 8:00 pm the mall broadcast that it was about to close.

Some protesters stayed on nearby roads. The police used a loudspeaker to read the Restriction Order, raised a blue flag warning at Yan Palace Pavilion, and began to disperse the crowd. Police surrounded District Councillor Andrew Chiu and his assistant. The assistant was violently pushed to the ground by several riot police officers. Afterwards, he could only blink and became unconscious. Police allowed first-aiders to enter the scene after a delay of five minutes. Andrew Chiu strongly condemned and regretted the police's actions. The police subdued a man outside Yan Palace Pavilion, who then passed out and was sent to the hospital for treatment.

The police issued a press release saying any person attending a public event with the common purpose of gathering was deemed to attend a group gathering, and that the upper limit of four people at group gatherings had to be observed, otherwise each participant would be liable to prosecution.

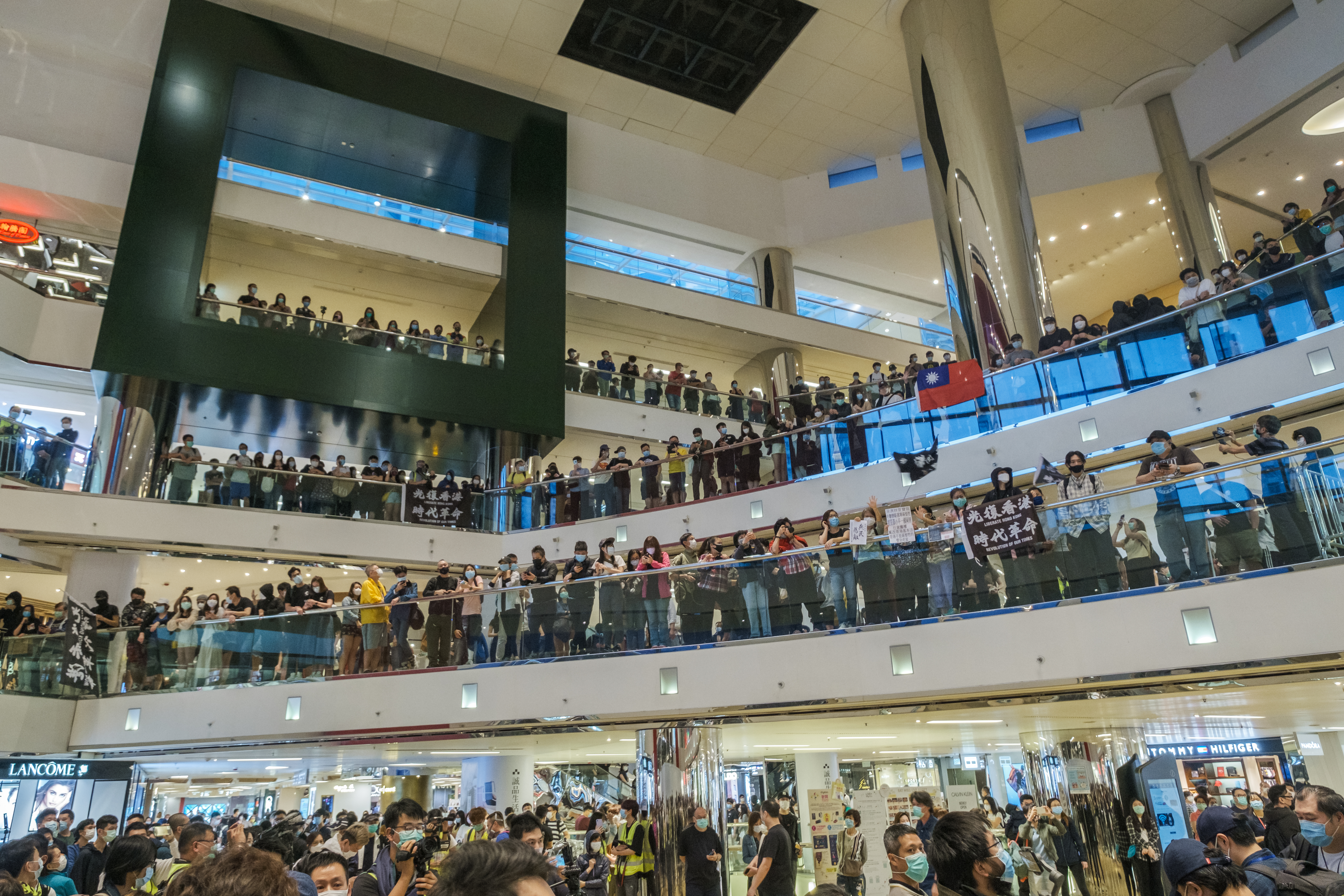
Protesters at Cityplaza

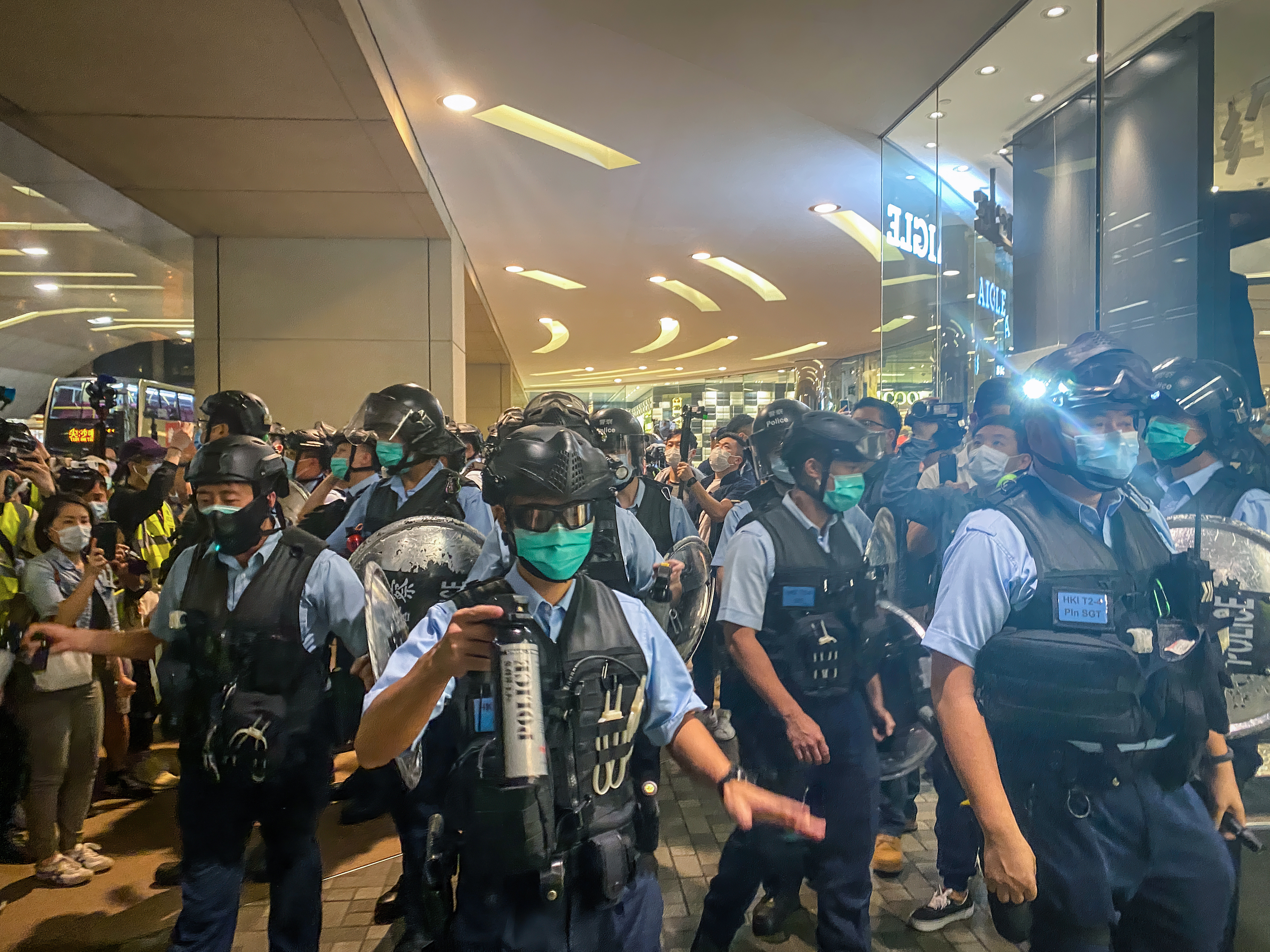
Police with pepper spray

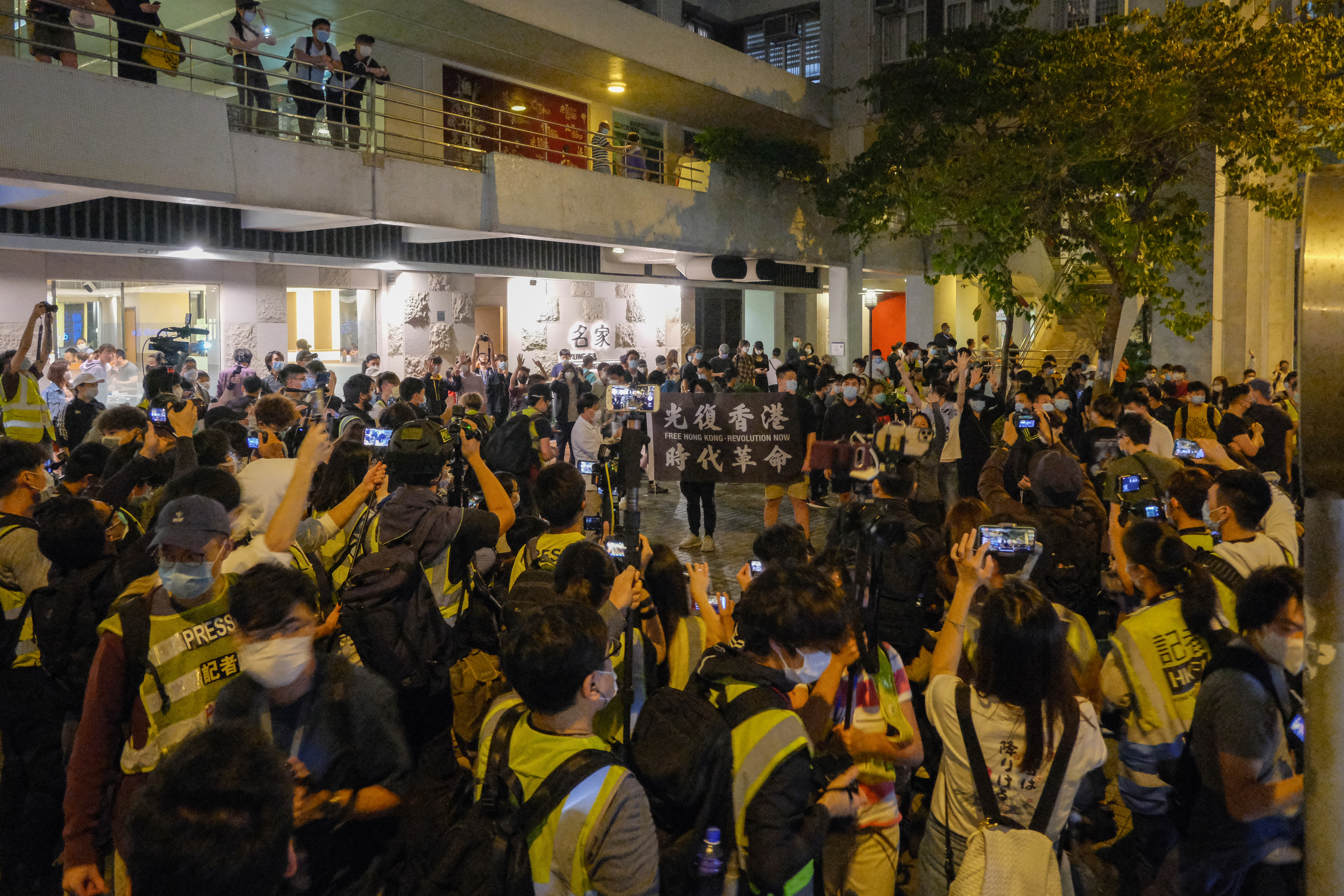
Protesters outside Cityplaza

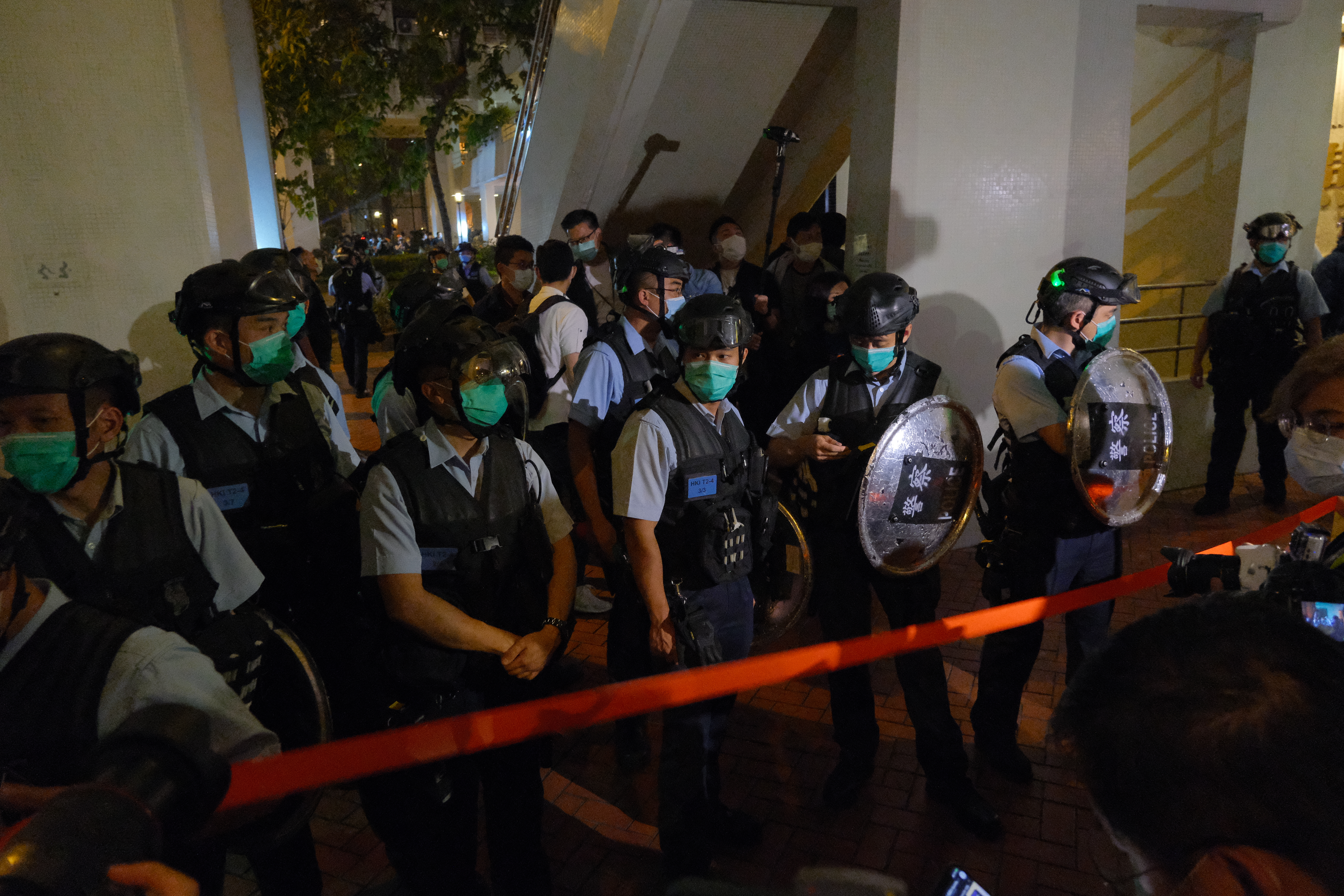
Police cordon outside of Cityplaza

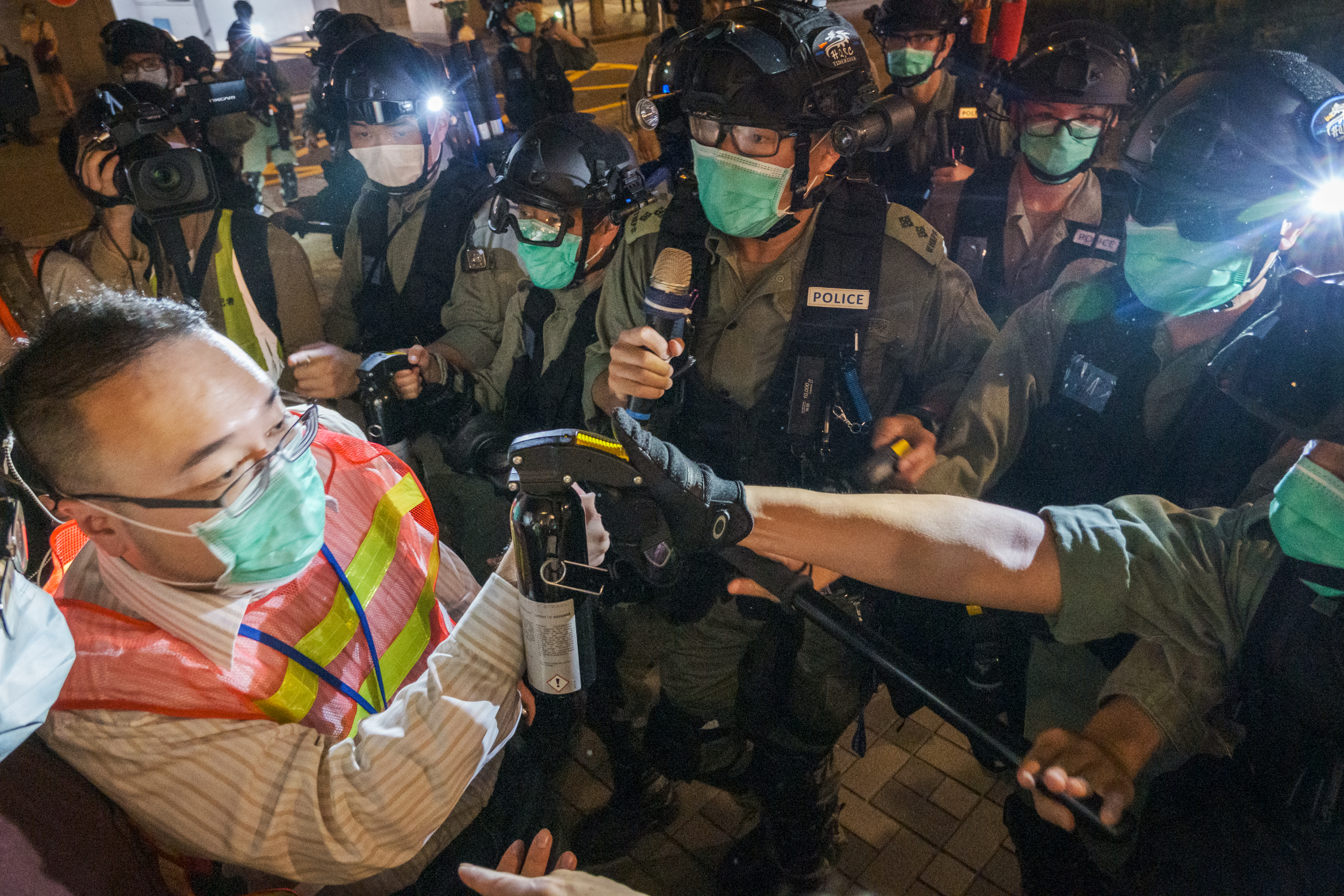
Andrew Chiu having pepper spray aimed at him

=== 28 April ===
About 6:00 pm, dozens of protesters participated in the "sing with you" activity in the atrium of the International Financial Center Mall in Central. They repeatedly chanted the slogan "Glory to Hong Kong". Before the event, at least 14 police cars were parked in the General Post Office, outside Hong Kong MTR station and the Exchange Square bus station, and a large number of uniformed police officers were on patrol at the entrances of the shopping malls. By 6:30 pm, two groups of police officers entered multiple floors of the mall and set up a blockade line in the atrium to drive away the citizens and reporters. The police used a megaphone to announce that the Restraining Order was in effect and warned the public not to gather in the shopping mall; many shops had closed their doors. Another group of police officers stopped several citizens outside the atrium and shops and issued fixed penalty notices. Jerome Lau Ting-sing, a Hong Kong businessman at the scene, criticised the police for not providing a time limit for the public to leave, nor issuing a warning. He believed the police officers were unreasonable and he would not pay a fine. Some people think the police abuse the Restriction Order to charge the public.

About 7:00 pm, Legislative Council member Ted Hui Chi-fung was present and asked police officers to not enter the mall. Later, Central and Western District Councillors, Sam Yip and Camille Yam were also present; Yam live streamed the protest on Facebook. Police officers briefly left the IFC mall, during which time a citizen dressed as North Korean leader Kim Jong Un appeared. By about 7:30 pm, nearly 200 uniformed police officers entered the mall again to intercept many protesters. Some protesters remained in the mall to sing and chant slogans. The police left the mall at 9 pm. Seven young people who had returned to the city from Cheung Chau said they were intercepted when entering the mall. They were brought to the station to register their ID cards before they were released.

=== 29 April ===
Protesters were originally scheduled to gather in the atrium of the Central International Financial Center shopping mall at 1:00 pm, but before the event began a large number of military uniformed police officers around the mall were on patrol. Later, the meeting place was changed to the Landmark Plaza, and epidemic prevention materials were distributed at the scene. There were to be no more than four people in a group, and they were to keep a distance of 1.5 metres (4 ft 11 in). About 30 people participated. The mall's security guard held a sign reading "maintain a safe social distance" and did not engage with the public. Around 1:30 pm, approximately ten police officers arrived at the scene, warning those who had gathered in the mall of being in violation of the Restriction Order and called on them to leave immediately or they would be issued a ticket. Central and Western District Councillor Sam Yip arrived at the scene and asked the police to leave, as the people present were holding a "health talk" and distributing material on coronavirus prevention. About 15 minutes after the disturbance, the participants dispersed and the police left the Landmark.

=== 30 April ===
From 7:00 pm onward, more than 80 protesters gathered near the atrium of the second phase of the Ginza Shopping Centre in Tin Shui Wai. A banner with the protest slogan Liberate Hong Kong, revolution of our times was displayed. Around 7:30 pm, a police officer entered the mall and warned the citizens they would be charged with a Restriction Order and left after five minutes. At 8:00 pm, the riot police raised a yellow flag outside the shopping mall Phase 1 to disperse the citizens and pulled up the orange blockade line. During this period, a citizen threw a glass bottle at the police officer. At 9:00 pm, the riot police raised the blue flag to carry out the dispersal operation. A police officer rushed to the entrance of the mall to collar a young man in uniform. This man was later searched with four young people and issued a ticket. One of the women was taken away because she did not bring her identity card. The riot police boarded the police car at 10:16 pm and left.
