= Timeline of reactions to the 2020 Hong Kong national security law (July 2021) =

Timeline of the 2019–2020 Hong Kong protests
| 2019 | | | March–June | | | | July | August | September | October | November | December |
| 2020 | January | February | March | April | May | June | July | August | September | October | November | December |
| 2021 | January | February | March | April | May | June | July | August | September–November | | | December |

After the 1 July police stabbing, Hong Kong police and the government characterized the incident as a "lone wolf" terrorist attack. Foreign media saw the stabbing as a sign of a steep decline of the reputation of the police in the eyes of some locals, a process that had begun with the 2019–2020 Hong Kong protests. They also considered the uncovering of a bomb plot on 5 July as evidence of a polarization in society, and pointed to the influence of diminishing legal ways to voice dissent in the year since the national security law came into effect. At the beginning of the month, the police arrested citizens who posted on the Internet for inciting others to kill the police. Later it persecuted members of the student union of Hong Kong University for having passed a motion, subsequently withdrawn, that had praised the "sacrifice" of the deceased attacker of 1 July.

The first trial under the national security law concluded on 30 July with a nine-year sentence. Defendant Tong Ying-kit, who on 1 July 2020 had driven a motorcycle into policemen while flying the protest slogan "Liberate Hong Kong, revolution of our times", had been tried by appointed national security judges and had been unable to obtain bail under the stringent national security bail conditions. Much of the time in the 15-day trial was taken by arguments about whether the slogan constituted a call for independence. The judges eventually embraced the argument by the prosecution that the slogan was "intended to communicate secessionist meaning" and was "capable of inciting others to commit secession". In view of the wide use of the slogan during the 2019–2020 protests, this was seen by observers as setting a precedent for future convictions. The sentence was considered as excessively harsh by critics from the democracy camp. Tong appealed his sentence; the retrial was scheduled for March 2022.

On 31 July, the Education Bureau cut ties with the Hong Kong Professional Teachers' Union hours after the union had come under attack by Chinese state media. The bureau justified its move by claiming that the union had been "dragging schools into politics". The move was seen by observers as another reflection of governmental pressure on civic society.

Chief Executive Carrie Lam said on 6 July that the government would strengthen its efforts to improve the supervision of social media to combat fake news or incitement of violence. She related the 1 July stabbing to the lax regulations to date. She said that all departments and government organizations would take part in the improvement.

== 1 July ==
=== 1 July protest banned ===
As it had done a year earlier, police issued a notice of objection to the annual 1 July democracy protest on the grounds of the COVID-19 pandemic. Police were closely guarding the Causeway Bay area, citing the Public Order Ordinance to close Victoria Park, and putting up tight cordons across the city. In Soy Street and in front of Langham Place, 11 arrests were made on suspicion of distribution of "seditious publications", including three leaders of Student Politicism; police put up orange cordon at the site of the arrest of the three on Soy Street and told the public to leave the area, citing COVID-19 public gathering restrictions, which limited gatherings to groups of at most four. Student Politicism had intended to start a street booth at the time of the arrests. The Confederation of Trade Unions had street booths quashed in Causeway Bay and Mong Kok. The League of Social Democrats managed to set up a street both at the Canal Road flyover. It had staged a four-person protest in the morning. 19 people were arrested in the city throughout the day.

=== Stabbing of a police officer ===
At 10:10 pm, Leung Kin-fai, a 50-year-old man, was outside Sogo Department Store in Causeway Bay. He suddenly approached from behind and stabbed a Tactical Unit police officer with a knife before stabbing himself in the heart. The police officer suffered an injury in his shoulder blade and a punctured lung. Leung was immediately overpowered by surrounding police officers and taken to hospital. He was certified dead at 11:20 pm that night.

== 2 July ==
=== Citizens went to Causeway Bay to lay flowers to commemorate the stabber ===
After the assassination, some netizens described the deceased Leung Kin-fai as a 'martyr' and 'brave'. Starting in the morning, citizens outside Sogo Department Store in Causeway Bay offered flowers to mourn. Some people offering free hugs at the scene were intercepted by police officers for investigation. From noon, all citizens holding flowers and near Sogo were searched. Some citizens put white flowers in mourning and were issued littering tickets by the police officers, who pointed out that the act of laying down flowers was suspected of inciting others. Plainclothes police officers were observed disposing flowers left by mourners.

As of 3 and 4 July, there were still citizens bringing white flowers to the scene of the crime. The police sent a number of officers to guard outside Sogo and intercepted and searched several citizens wearing black clothes.

== 4 July ==
=== Statements by Raymond Siu and Johannes Chan on mourning activities regarding 1 July stabbing ===
The new Commissioner of Police, Raymond Siu, stated that the recent mourning of Leung Kin-fai on 1 July violated morals and ethics. Johannes Chan, professor of public law at the University of Hong Kong, said it was impossible to determine whether the incident is a terrorist activity and the police should not expand the law indefinitely. He opined that it was far-fetched to consider the mourning of the assailant as violating the law. He said that mourning could be motivated by sympathy, or be an expression of dissatisfaction with the government.

=== Two people arrested for allegedly inciting to kill the police and set fire to police stations ===
On 4 July, police arrested a 20-year-old woman and a 26-year-old man in Tin Shui Wai and Sha Tin, respectively, on suspicion of inciting others to murder police officers and to set fire to police stations. Police said that the two had allegedly posted "abusive comments and inciting messages" on Telegram and LIHKG. While they declined to say that there was a link to the 1 July stabbing of a police officer, they noted that the posts had been made a day after the incident.

== 5 July ==
=== Man arrested for sedition over allegedly inciting to attack police officers ===
The police arrested a 34-year-old man in Yau Ma Tei for inciting others to commit crimes with intent to injure others, alleging that he had made a statement about 'cutting police officers' on an online discussion platform on 2 July. Police did not rule out the possibility of additional arrests.

== 6 July ==
=== Returning Valiant members arrested by the National Security Department on suspicion of attempting to manufacture explosives ===
The National Security Department of the Hong Kong Police stated that it had smashed the radical Hong Kong pro-independence organization Returning Valiant in multiple districts across Hong Kong on 5 July and arrested nine people suspected of attempting to manufacture the explosive TATP. They said that the group had planned to attack undersea tunnels, railways, courts and also place bombs in garbage bins. Nine persons arrested in the case were aged between 15 and 39, including six secondary school students, as well as a public relations and communications officer of the School of Continuing Education of Baptist University, a secondary school teacher and an unemployed person. Police froze more than HK$600,000 in assets. Senior Superintendent Li Kwai-wah of the National Security Department said that the group had rented a hostel room near Nathan Road in Tsim Sha Tsui as a bomb laboratory in June, and had planned to launch an attack two court buildings in early July.

=== Bank of America lawyer sentenced to 4 months and 2 weeks imprisonment ===
On 22 June, Samuel Phillip Bickett, a 37-year-old Bank of America lawyer, had been convicted on the charge of assaulting a police officer in 2019. The police officer had been hitting a teenager who had jumped a MTR subway turnstile in an attempt to stop him, and this evolved into an altercation involving other bystanders. When asked on video if he was “popo”, the police officer responded “No,” at which point Bickett reached in to grab hold of the man’s weapon, resulting in a scuffle. The magistrate of the Eastern Magistrates' Court, Arthur Lam Hei-wei, said he found the police officer's response "perfectly understandable" as he viewed "popo" as a "disrespectful reference" by the crowd, and referred to later points in the video in which the police officer did identify himself. He also pointed out that the officer had sustained multiple injuries caused by Bickett, and cited the risk that the offence might inspire imitation and posed a threat to public order. Bickett was sentenced on 6 July to 4 months and 2 weeks in prison. U.S. Consulate General in Hong Kong and Macau also sent representatives to observe. The staff of the consulate urged the Hong Kong government to maintain judicial independence, ensure that the court is free from political interference, and respect everyone's right to a fair trial.

=== Civil Rights Observer dissolved ===
Since the establishment of the Umbrella Movement in 2014, Civil Rights Observer, which is concerned about the rights of the police and human rights in Hong Kong, issued a statement saying that due to the current situation in Hong Kong and the shortage of operating resources, it would cease operations on 5 July.

== 7 July ==
=== Two students found guilty of rioting ===
On 12 November 2019, two CUHK students and two vocational students from PolyU were arrested. Four people were charged with rioting, violation of the Prohibition on Face Covering Regulation and possession of offensive weapons, etc. Among them, an 18-year-old vocational student was charged with possession of a laser pointer. All four students denied the charges. As of 7 July, District Court ruled that the 13 police officers accused by judge Clement Lee who gave evidence were all honest and reliable witnesses. The first two defendants (Chan Hey-hang, a CUHK student, and Lee Chun-ho, a PolyU student) were found not guilty of rioting. However, vocational student Cheung Chun-ho and CUHK student Tang Hei-man, who had appeared in court to defend themselves, were convicted of rioting. The judge dismissed the defence of Tang who said that he had intended to attended the graduation ceremony of his sister, and that of Tang who had said she hoped to get creative inspiration for literary works. He agreed with the view of the persecution that Cheung had actively taken part in the confrontation, while Tang had been dressed similarly to the demonstrators and stayed on the front line for 13 minutes, thereby encouraging the confrontation. He cleared Cheung of the charge of possession a dangerous weapon, citing irregularities in the police handling of the evidence.

=== Members of the LegCo asked the government to propose CCP museum in Hong Kong ===
Secretary for Constitutional and Mainland Affairs, Erick Tsang, attended the meeting of the Legislative Council and responded to the question by Luk Chung-hung, a LegCo member of FTU, on the celebration of the centenary of the Chinese Communist Party and conservation activities. He stated that "without the Communist Party, there would be no New China, and without a New China, there would be no one country, two systems, and we will return to the motherland." Christopher Cheung from the financial services industry pointed out that the Hong Kong government usually had "zero propaganda" about the CCP, and said that the opposition had falsely attacked and stigmatized the CCP over the years. LegCo DAB member Gary Chan and BPA member Jeffrey Lam proposed to build a permanent Communist Party History Museum in Hong Kong. Tsang pointed out that the public library already has CCP-related publications, and the Hong Kong Museum of History has long-term exhibitions related to the CCP, in Wu Kau Tang also has an anti-Japanese monument. The proposal to establish a CCP exhibition hall would be forwarded to the relevant departments.

== 8 July ==
=== European Parliament passed resolutions calling for sanctions on Chinese and Hong Kong officials ===
With 578 votes in favor, 29 votes against, and 73 abstentions, European Parliament passed a non-binding resolution strongly condemning the Hong Kong government's freezing of the assets of the Apple Daily and the arrest of the group director and editor-in-chief Jimmy Lai, which resulted in the Apple Daily being forced to close. The resolution cited as reasons what it called Beijing's dismantling of Hong Kong's free society, obliterating freedom of the media and freedom of speech, and suppressing the last opposition to the government through the new electoral system. The resolution also requested the Chinese government to abolish the Hong Kong national security law, urging the Hong Kong government to stop harassing and intimidating journalists, and to release peaceful protesters and democrats who had been arbitrarily imprisoned. The motion also called for sanctions against many officials, including Chief Executive Carrie Lam, Secretary for Administration John Lee, Secretary for Justice Teresa Cheng, Secretary for Security Chris Tang, Director of the Hong Kong and Macau Affairs Office Xia Baolong, and Director of the Hong Kong Liaison Office Luo Huining.

== 10 July ==
=== Twenty-one countries issued a statement on the closure of Apple Daily ===
Media Freedom Coalition composed of 21 countries including the United States, United Kingdom, Canada, Japan, and Australia issued a joint statement expressing serious concern over the closure of Apple Daily and the arrest of its staff, and pointed out that the government Hong Kong uses the suppression of the press by the national security law to undermine Hong Kong's high degree of autonomy and standardize the rights and freedoms granted to Hong Kong people under the Basic Law. It called on the Chinese and Hong Kong governments to respect and maintain Hong Kong's media freedom.

== 12 July ==
=== Police arrested five more people in connection with Returning Valiant ===
The number of arrests in connection with Returning Valiant increased to 14 after officers of the National Security Department arrested five more people for 'conspiracy to planning the terrorist activities'. The arrested were between 15 and 37 years old, including three middle school students, one female and one property management staff of the Emperor Group who was accused of having funded the organization. Emperor Group stated that it "strongly condemned" illegal violent acts, that it had suspended the employee, and that it would fully cooperate with the police investigation. The three middle school students arrested in the case were formally charged with one count of conspiracy to commit a terrorist activity and are currently being remanded in custody awaiting trial.

== 15 July ==
=== Cannes Film Festival shows protest documentary ===
Shortly before the 74th Cannes Film Festival, a screening of the protest documentary Revolution of Our Times produced by local director Kiwi Chow was announced. Chow expressed his gratitude to the Cannes Film Festival, and in an interview with The Wall Street Journal, he said that he "does not want to figure out where the red line is".

=== Police raids Hong Kong University for 3 hours ===
At about 3 pm, dozens of officers from the National Security Department of the Hong Kong Police arrived on the campus of the University of Hong Kong based on a court search warrant and were divided into three groups to the Student Union Complex, the Student Union Campus TV Office of the Civic Center, and the Undergrad magazine office. Evidence search was conducted and a large number of items were seized, including the telephone of the editor-in-chief of Undergrad, the computer host of station CampusTV, and the letter of apology issued by the student union after the mourning motion was passed. The student union complex was unsealed at about 6 pm, and the police seized at least two large black bags, a suitcase and two blue plastic boxes to leave. Kong Chak-ho, chairman of CampusTV of the Hong Kong University Student Union, said that the police had searched for evidence in the office for nearly two hours and were investigating a case in which the Student Union Council was suspected of violating Article 27 of the national security law of "promoting terrorism and inciting terrorist activities." Undergrad said that the editor-in-chief Lau Kin-hei was released after being questioned for nearly three and a half hours, and Lau's phone, a camera, academy stamps, two voice recorders were seized, and an apology issued by the Student Union for passing the mourning motion. The deputy editor-in-chief was released after about an hour and a half of questioning.

=== U.S. issues business advisory on Hong Kong ===
U.S. Department of State, Treasury, Commerce, and Homeland Security have issued warnings about the commercial risks in Hong Kong, stating that American companies operating and operating in Hong Kong are subject to the national security law and pointing out that some foreign citizens are currently being accused of violating the law, including a U.S. citizen. The announcement also mentions the risks associated with electronic surveillance of companies in Hong Kong without search warrants and the need to hand over company and customer information to the authorities. Chinese Foreign Ministry spokesperson Zhao Lijian urged the United States to stop interfering in Hong Kong affairs and said that China would respond firmly and forcefully to any punitive U.S. measures. The Hong Kong government criticized the U.S. government for trying to create panic.

=== U.S. imposes sanctions on Hong Kong Liaison Office officials ===
The U.S. Treasury Department added seven deputy directors of the Hong Kong Liaison Office to the designated sanctions list, including Chen Dong, He Jing, Lu Xinning, Qiu Hong, Tan Tieniu, Yang Jianping, and Yin Zonghua. Secretary of State Antony Blinken issued a statement through the U.S. State Department that said that Chinese and Hong Kong officials had systematically damaged Hong Kong's democratic system in the past year and caused the deterioration of Hong Kong's business environment. At the same time, he criticized the Hong Kong government for using political motives to suppress media freedom.

The Office of the Commissioner of the Ministry of Foreign Affairs in Hong Kong issued a statement strongly condemning the so-called commercial warnings and sanctions of the US government.

== 21 July ==
=== National Security Department arrests and charged 4 senior officials from Apple Daily ===
National Security Department of the Hong Kong Police charged Lam Man-chung, former executive editor of Apple Daily, for 'conspiracy to collude with foreign countries or foreign forces to endanger national security.' On the same day, the bail arrangements of former vice president Chan Pui-man and former English director Fung Wai-kong were revoked.

=== Second anniversary of 7.21 Yuen Long attack ===
On the second anniversary of the Yuen Long attack, the police strengthened their defenses in the Yuen Long area. Among them, more than 100 police officers patrolled and deployed guards on the overpass and grounds of the MTR Yuen Long station. They were wearing bulletproof vests. Police officers also stepped up patrols and intercepted citizens in the Yuen Long city centre. At 6 pm, Tin Shui Wai Connection, Confederation of Trade Unions and Wong Yat-chin, the convener of Student Politicism, set up a street booth at the ground public transport interchange at Yuen Long station, handing out leaflets. Police officers registered their ID card information, and repeatedly asked citizens at the scene not to stay on the grounds that they might violate the gathering restriction order.

Members of the Hong Kong Hotel Union set up a street station at the same location at about 2 pm. They were intercepted by the police during the distribution of the epidemic prevention leaflet with the word 721 written on it. The police officer claimed that the cartoon pattern on the leaflet was related to the "black storm". It is also warned that if the distribution continues, the staff of the National Security Department will be notified to investigate.

== 22 July ==
=== National Security Department arrested 5 people for publishing allegedly seditious children's books ===
The National Security Department of the Hong Kong Police arrested five members of the General Union of Hong Kong Speech Therapists, aged between 25 and 28, on suspicion of conspiracy to publish seditious publications. The report stated that the incident was related to children's publications such as Guardians of the Sheep Village, 12 Warriors of the Sheep Village, and Dustman of the Sheep Village. Approximately 550 related publications and leaflets were seized during the operation, and the union's assets of approximately HK$160,000 were also frozen. Senior Superintendent of the National Security Department, Li Kwai-wah, described that the publication used children's cartoons to beautify illegal activities and poison children, and with the intention to “bring into hatred or contempt or to excite disaffection” against the government and “the administration of justice in Hong Kong”. He urged parents owning the relevant picture books to dispose of them, even though he said he believed their possession was probably not an offence. In a statement, the Confederation of Trade Unions said, "The case again shows how the law is just being used by the authorities to spread fear."

Among the five arrested, Lai Man-ling, the chairman of the trade union, and Melody Yeung, the vice chairman, were charged with one count of 'conspiracy to publish, distribute, display or copy seditious publications'. They were brought before the West Kowloon Magistrates' Court on 23 July. While the two were not required to respond for the time being, but Victor So, the designated judge and chief magistrate of the Hong Kong national security law, refused to release them on bail and adjourned the case until 30 August. The prosecution stated in court that it does not rule out more people being arrested or considering other charges. A small protest by the Hong Kong Confederation of Trade Unions in support of the duo took place outside court. On 10 September 2022, the five, who had pleaded not guilty, were sentenced to 19 months in jail.

=== Seven people in white convicted of riot in Yuen Long attack ===
Seven of the attacking white-shirted men of the 2019 Yuen Long attack were convicted by District Court judge Eddie Yip, and sentenced to three and a half to seven years in prison. The judge considered the attackers to have abused the national flag by attaching it to their weapons, and said a deterrent sentence had been necessary as "[s]uch random and lawless attacks have instilled extreme fear in citizens". A dozen supporters of the defendants rallied outside court, claiming that the latter had merely defended their homeland.

== 26 July ==
=== Former district councillors sentenced to prison ===
Former Tai Po District Councillor Dalu Lin, Man Nim-chi, and current Tai Po District Councillor Herman Yiu participated in the event to mourn the death of Chow Tsz-lok at the Tai Po Mega Mall on 8 March 2020. Man had allegedly shone a flashlight into the eyes of a police officer. The two and Yiu were charged with the crime of unlawful assembly. Among them, Man and So Yeung-yun, an assistant to a councillor and a construction worker, were also charged with one crime of assaulting a policeman. The three were also charged with one count of possession of wireless communication devices without a license. In the case, Man and So pleaded guilty to all three charges. Principal Magistrate Don So used 4 months as the starting point for sentencing. In the end, Man and So were sentenced to three months in prison and fined HK$1,500 for possession of wireless communicators without a license.

== 30 July ==
=== Tong Ying-kit sentenced to 9 years in prison ===
During protests on 1 July 2020, the first full day that the Hong Kong national security law had been in force, 24-year-old Tong Ying-kit drove a motorcycle displaying a flag with the slogan "Liberate Hong Kong, revolution of our times" into a group of police officers, injuring three of them. The case, which was the first national security law case, had been tried on 15 July. Designated High Court judges Esther Toh, Anthea Pang and Wilson Chan ruled on 27 July that Tong was guilty of 'inciting others to commit secession' and 'terrorist activities'. The starting point of the sentence for the crime of 'inciting secession' was 6 and a half years, and the starting point for the sentence for the crime of 'terrorism' was 8 years. The final sentence was 9 years in prison and 10 years of driving suspension. As the sentencing was read out, some supporters of Tong were crying while others told him to "hang in there," to which Tong replied, "you guys also hang in there too."

During the court case, prosecution and defense had argued at length over the semantics, history and context of whether the "Liberate" slogan amounted to an incitement for independence. Mitigation entered by defence which cited the grandmother of Tong, who suffered from cancer, as wishing to see her grandson before her death, was countered by the judges by saying that Tong should have considered his family circumstances before embarking on criminal acts. They added that the remorse that Tong had expressed could not count in the mitigation as he had not pleaded guilty.

Tong appealed his sentence. In November 2021, the Court of Appeal scheduled the appeal for March 2022.

== 31 July ==
=== Hong Kong Education Bureau cuts ties with Professional Teachers' Union ===
The Education Bureau cut ties with the Hong Kong Professional Teachers' Union hours after the union had come under attack by Chinese state media People’s Daily and news agency Xinhua. The bureau justified its move by saying that the union had been "dragging schools into politics". In its decision, the bureau also cited the connection of the union to the Civil Human Rights Front and the Hong Kong Alliance in Support of Patriotic Democratic Movements of China, who had likewise come under government pressure.
