= Immolation of Lee Chi-cheung =

Attack during the 2019–2020 Hong Kong protests

Lee Chi-cheung
- Chinese: 李智良
Transcriptions
Standard Mandarin
- Hanyu Pinyin: Lǐ Zhìliáng
Yue: Cantonese
- Jyutping: lei5 zi3 loeng4

On 11 November 2019, Lee Chi-cheung, a 57-year-old construction worker, was doused in flammable liquid and set on fire in Ma On Shan, Hong Kong. The immolation occurred during an altercation between Lee and a group of protesters on a walkway linking the Bayshore Towers housing complex with the Ma On Shan Public Library.

== Incident ==
Construction worker Lee Chi-cheung (misidentified as Leung Chi-cheung in some early sources) was at Ma On Shan station at noon when he saw a group of protesters defacing buildings. He chased the protesters to the walkway. The man appeared to have been injured during the chase. Allegedly he told the protesters that they were not Chinese and they responded that they were Hong Kongers. Two videos of the incident were recorded, one of which showed a protester dousing Lee in flammable liquid and setting him on fire. After the videos were released, some activists explained that Lee had attacked the protesters. He was shown in photos at the station standing shirtless and conscious, presumably after he had been set on fire, causing suspicion that the incident had been staged. Hong Kong hospital authorities confirmed that Lee had been taken to Prince of Wales Hospital and was conscious upon arrival, but was in critical condition and admitted to intensive care. He suffered second-degree burns on 28% of his body, mostly on his arms and chest, as well as head trauma.

A year after the incident, Lee told court at the trial of two people accused of disorderly conduct in the lead-up to the incident that he was standing up for justice when he confronted the protesters for vandalising a railway station but he should have called the police instead. Lee said he was struck on the head while trying to stop them from smashing windows and damaging facilities at Ma On Shan MTR station. He chased them and became involved in a scuffle with passers-by who blocked his path on a footbridge outside Ma On Shan Plaza. Lee said he was mad at them, who pointed fingers at him, and he stayed to argue with them. Video footage showed a woman telling the man to "Get lost. Go back to the Greater Bay Area." The man responded, "So you are all helping the black-clad people. You all should die. You all are not Chinese." Suddenly more hardcore protesters appeared from behind them and poured flammable liquid on Lee and set him alight.

== Aftermath ==
Police classified the incident as attempted murder. In an interview with CGTN, Lee's wife said that her husband was in a coma and had undergone skin surgery on his hands and needed further surgical procedures on his face, abdomen, and chest. She said Lee never talked about politics at home and never participated in any political events. She hoped "the rioters can stop their violent acts as soon as possible and not mess up Hong Kong."

On the online forum LIHKG, a discussion on the merit of burning the man had over 5000 users saying the act had not been excessive while only around 300 said it was excessive. Some said that if life is not valued then it is no different than the police.

The culprits of the attack were never found while Kwong Yiu-man, 39, and Chan Hoi-wan, 34, were arrested seven days after the incident over the verbal confrontation beforehand. They denied one joint count of public disorder but confirmed they were present at the scene of the incident. Lee failed to identify Chan as the woman who argued with him but recognized one of their voices as the one who told the protesters to run at the railway station.
