= Death of Chan Yin-lam =

Death during 2019–2020 Hong Kong protests

- Part of the 2019–2020 Hong Kong protests
- CCTV footage released by the Hong Kong Design Institute of Chan the day of her probable death, 19 September 2019
- Date: Between 7.20 pm 19 September 2019 and 20 September 2019
- Location: Harbour outside Yau Tong, Hong Kong; 22.2977°N 114.2326°E
- Cause: Unknown
- Casualties: Christy Chan Yin-lam

Chan Yin-lam (16 July 2004 – 19-22 September 2019) was a teenage Hong Kong girl whose death sparked much speculation and controversy due to its unusual circumstances. Chan's death occurred during the 2019 Hong Kong protests, and gave rise to speculations by anti-government protesters about its cause. Lam was a 15-year-old student who died on or shortly after 19 September 2019. Her naked corpse was discovered floating in the sea near Yau Tong, Hong Kong, on 22 September 2019. Following a preliminary autopsy, police asserted that no foul play was suspected and that Chan had killed herself, in part due to her known history of mental illness, psychosis, self-harm and attempted suicide.

Protesters alleged, however, that she was murdered by Hong Kong authorities in connection to her participation in the 2019 Hong Kong protests. The coroner's inquest concluded with the jury unanimously returning an open verdict, after Magistrate Ko Wai-Hung ruled out both homicide and suicide as possible causes due to insufficient evidence to support this. Protesters asserted that the government had orchestrated her death, in-part due to the lack of publicly available evidence of her death. Additionally, they believed Chan's mother to be in on the alleged conspiracy, due to her accepting the government's position, and some protesters were arrested for the harassment of Chan's mother.

== Background ==
Chan Yin-lam, also known as Christy Chan, was 15 years old. Her parents were separated. She had a "complicated" family background and a history of running away from home. Prior to her disappearance, she had been staying at a girls' home.

She attended the Pok Oi Hospital Tang Pui King Memorial College, Hong Kong, and had, just a few days prior to her disappearance, started a course at the Youth College attached to the Vocational Training Council (VTC). She also worked a part-time job in the restaurant trade. Media reports indicate that Chan had won awards in inter-school swimming competitions. Chan had received regular diving training and was once a member of the diving team.

Chan's death took place in the backdrop of the 2019–2020 Hong Kong protests, increasing distrust of the government, and hostility towards the police. According to her friends, Chan had attended protests, while police confirmed that she had not been arrested during the protests.

== Disappearance and death ==
On 19 September at 14:15, Chan left a group of friends at Mei Foo and sent a message to some friends stating she was going back home. It was her last message before her disappearance. Friends put out a missing person's brief after she failed to reappear and her family called the police on 21 September. According to surveillance footage from Youth College she attended, she left the campus barefoot and walked towards the waterfront near Tseung Kwan O on 19 September.

The MTRC confirmed that station cleaners had found a mobile phone and some stationery belonging to Chan on the ground near an exit of Tiu Keng Leng station. Station staff contacted Chan's family members as confirmed by the mobile phone call logs. A family member picked up the lost property two days later.

At 11 am on 22 September, a man who was fishing saw a floating object with a human form 100 meters off the coast from Devil's Peak. Hong Kong Police boats were dispatched, and it was discovered to be the naked corpse of a human female. Police initially reported that the victim was a female suspected of being between 25 and 30 years of age, 1.5m in height, medium build, with long blond hair. On 9 October, responding to media inquiries, police confirmed that the naked corpse belonged to the 15-year-old Chan.

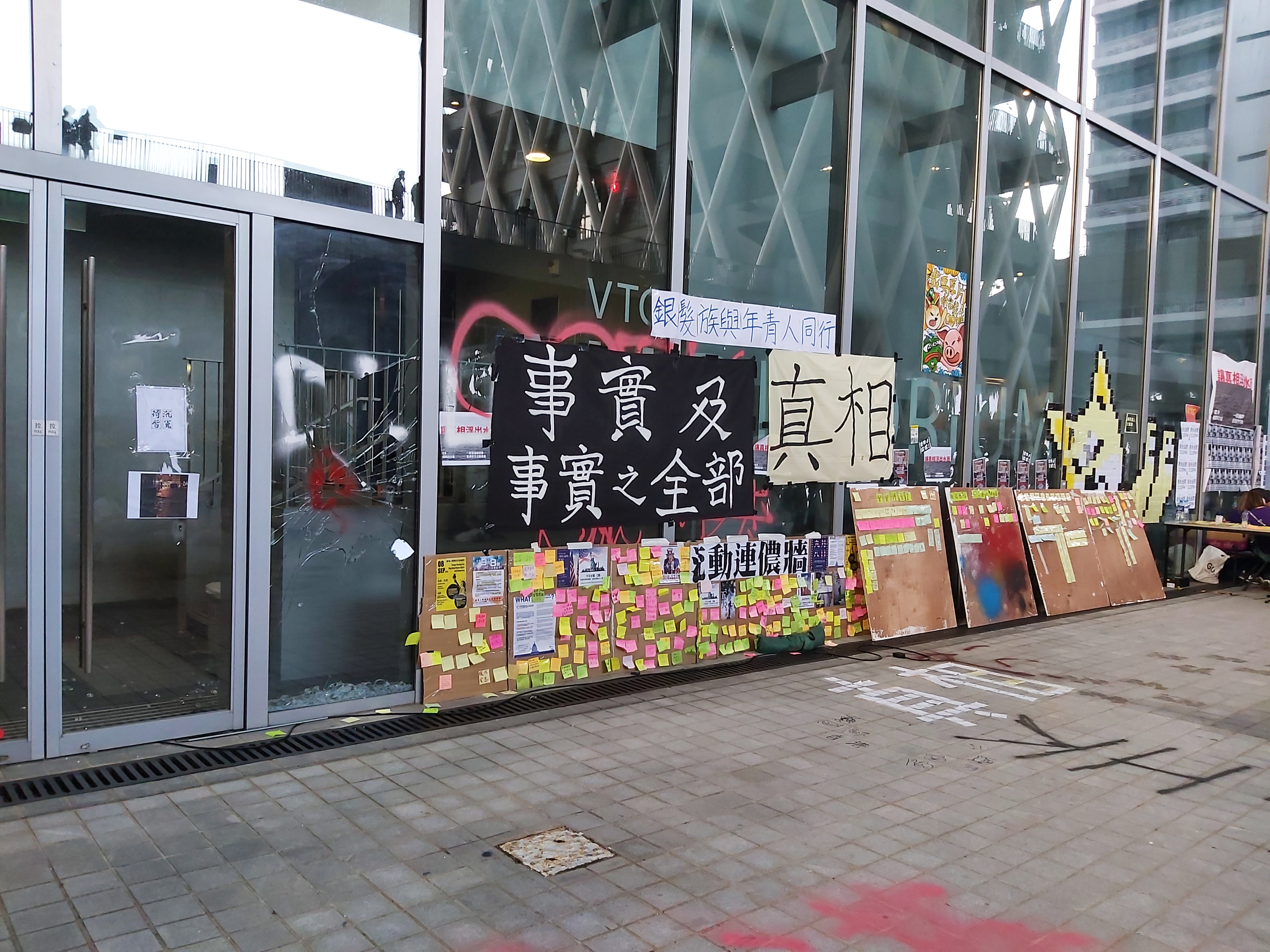
A Lennon Wall at Hong Kong Design Institute, the school Chan attended before her death.

The police originally requested a court warrant on 27 September on the grounds that the case was a murder, but changed the categorisation to "dead body found" (not suspicious) several days later. Her mother's later interview and the police's assertion that Chan had killed herself were met with some scepticism: there were doubts that Chan had killed herself by drowning, as she was an award-winning swimmer. Furthermore, waning trust in the government and the police and the change in designation led to rumours circulating on social media. The police and government officials were rumoured to have murdered her for participating in the 2019 Hong Kong protests and then covered-up her death. The Hong Kong police and government have denied these allegations. Pro-government posts, photos, memes and videos also propagated unsubstantiated claims that foreign forces were behind the demonstrations.

=== HKDI footage ===
Students from the Hong Kong Design Institute, where she was a student, demanded the release of CCTV footage from 19 September as Chan was last seen on campus. On 15 October, after a sit-in, campus management acceded to the demands and released some partial footage, but disgruntled students demanded the integral unedited footage with a 30-minute deadline. When they failed to comply with the deadline, school premises were vandalised, surveillance cameras were damaged and a fire alarm was set off. The VTC later suspended all classes between 15 and 17 October. The VTC has since released additional CCTV clips after 200 students, amid class suspension, rallied inside the campus to support an online appeal for an indefinite class boycott.

After the Design Institute had disclosed surveillance videos and the girl's mother had appealed for an end to the speculation of Chan's death, students continued to demand the release of integral footage from surveillance cameras for 29 and 30 October. Masked protesters accused the school of downplaying the situation; they continued to damage facilities and equipment on campus for two days, with the police eventually being called.

Online rumours suggested that the girl in the footage was an imposter, and that an actress had appeared in some cover-up by authorities, although there is little evidence to support this claim. At the coroner's inquest, Chan's family members, social workers, and friends all identified the girl on the footage as Chan. Ho Yun-loi, her grandfather, confirmed that he saw Chan in the same clothing on the morning of 19 September. The Coroner's Court jury accepted in the verdict that the girl in the footage was Chan.

=== Cremation ===
Chan's body was cremated on 10 October, the day after police had confirmed the corpse as Chan's. Suspicions were stirred by the apparently hasty cremation so soon after the death, but the police countered that the coroner had authorised the process. Former forensic pathologist Philip Beh Swan-lip commented that the circumstances of the discovery and cremation of Chan's body were suspicious: discoveries of fully naked bodies in the sea are generally treated as suspect and would require thorough investigations. Beh agreed that Chan's body had been hastily cremated, and urged police to release further information about the autopsy and for a coroner's inquest to be undertaken.

=== Interview and harassment of Chan's mother ===
In an interview with TVB News on 17 October, Chan's mother, Ho Pui-yee, said that after looking at all the relevant CCTV footage, she believed that her daughter's death was a suicide. She said that although she was initially suspicious of the death, she said that her daughter was not emotionally stable, and may well have had psychosis as well as repeated auditory hallucinations that had prevented her from sleeping. She said that her daughter participated in distributing leaflet for the protests in June, but had become disillusioned by July. She added that she had been doxxed since her daughter's death, resulting in her being harassed at work and telephoned at all hours. Ho pleaded to the general public to end the speculation and leave her alone.

Some disputed Ho's identity in the early days following Chan's death. She had long hair and wore a surgical mask in her TV interview, but some people online pointed to Facebook photos of Chan's mother with shorter hair in July 2019 to question the identity of Ho as Chan's mother. A DNA test conducted for the Coroner's Court inquest on 9 July 2020 verified Ho's identity as Chan's mother. On 24 August 2020, two people were arrested for public order offences after a crowd harassed Ho as she left the Coroner's Court hearing.

== Cultural references ==
In the self-penned Cantonese composition "Explicit Comment" (人話) released in late 2019, singer-songwriter Charmaine Fong made reference to the public's scepticism of the official narrative of Chan's death with the lyric "The truth has long since disappeared; write your ridiculous plots". In the associated music video, the last-known footage of Chan and of police press conferences are juxtaposed.

== See also ==
- Death of Chow Tsz-lok
- Death of Luo Changqing
- List of solved missing person cases (post-2000)
- List of unsolved deaths
