= Death of Chow Tsz-lok =

2019 Hong Kong protester death

- Part of the 2019–2020 Hong Kong protests
- Chow Tsz-lok was last captured on Sheung Tak car park's security footage, timestamped at around 01:02 on 4 November 2019.
- Date: 8 November 2019
- Time: 08:09HKT (00:09 UTC)
- Location: Queen Elizabeth Hospital, Kowloon, Hong Kong; 22°18′42″N 114°15′40″E
- Cause: Cardiac arrest due to injuries from a fall of 4.3 m in Sheung Tak Estate, New Territories, Hong Kong. Open verdict

In the early hours of 4 November 2019, Chow Tsz-lok, a 22-year-old student of the Hong Kong University of Science and Technology fell from the third floor inside a car park in Tseung Kwan O, Hong Kong, in the context of anti-government protests in the territory. Chow, who was clad in black clothing that had become an unofficial uniform for protesters, had been wandering alone inside the building in the moments preceding the fall. The car park was close to an area of confrontation between protesters and police.

Chow sustained multiple injuries, including a severe brain injury as a result of his fall. He died due to a cardiac arrest four days later. The death stirred great emotions as many blamed the police and the government, while the police strenuously denied responsibility for his death. The government failed to conduct an independent investigation, and this triggered an escalation of violence of the ongoing protests.

The Coroner's inquest found no evidence to suggest that Chow had taken part in the protest at the time. As the jury was unable to make a determination about the cause of death, the coroner pronounced an open verdict.

== Incident ==
Continuing and accumulated grievances against police brutality since the start of the anti-ELAB protests led to doxing of police officers and calls for revenge. Private details of a police officer's wedding in Tseung Kwan O on 3 November 2019 were thus leaked, and calls were made to crash it. Around 16:00 on that day, the police dispersed protesters who were disrupting the wedding held at the Crowne Plaza Hotel. Riot police arrived near the hotel about two hours later. Then, around 00:20 on 4 November, around 100 protesters gathered at the junction of Tong Ming and Tong Chun streets, with some creating roadblocks.

Early on 4 November, a 22-year-old second-year computer science undergraduate student at the Hong Kong University of Science and Technology (HKUST), Chow Tsz-Lok, sustained severe head injuries due to a fall from the third to the second storey of the Sheung Tak car park in Tseung Kwan O, near an area of confrontation between protesters and police. According to his father, Chow, also known as Alex Chow, had left their flat at around 23:40 on 3 November 2019, wearing a black top, deep-grey shorts, black running shoes, a black cap, and a dark backpack. Chow did not disclose to his family where he was going.

Map displaying the whereabouts of Chow Tsz-lok before the incident

CCTV footage showed that Chow was wandering alone, backwards and forwards between the inside the car park and on a connecting footbridge from 0:26 until 01:02 – the last moment he was captured on camera. The fall itself was not captured in the footage due to the operational camera rotations and parked vehicles blocking the view.

The police said that they fired tear gas in the area near the car park from 00:41 to 00:57. As reported in Time magazine, it was initially unclear whether or not the tear gas, fired near the car park where protesters and officers clashed, had played a role in Chow's fall. The Seattle Post-Intelligencer said that television footage showed police had fired tear gas at the building in which Chow fell "minutes earlier". Tear gas was reported at the junction of Tong Ming Street and Tong Chun Street, to the western side of the car park, on the opposite side of the building and about 120 metres (parallel to the building) to 160 metres (from the junction) away from the spot where Chow fell. Security footage released by the building owner Link REIT showed that there was no police presence nor significant amounts of tear gas inside the car park in the moments before Chow fell.

The police stated that officers conducted a dispersal operation in the building late Sunday, from 23:06 until 23:20, before Chow had arrived there. A second operation, to disperse protesters who had allegedly been throwing objects at officers on the street from above, took place at 01:05 after Chow had been found unconscious. Police denied that there were any police officers inside the building when Chow was walking around there, nor did they chase after him before he fell. The police concluded their dispersal operation in the car park at 01:25 and in the nearby area around the Sheung Tak car park at 01:45.

At 01:05, police were informed by a civilian that a person had fallen. Firefighters attending to the injured requested an ambulance at 01:11. At 01:15, as seen in CCTV footage, over 20 police officers arrived at the spot where Chow had fallen and left about a minute later. Suzette Foo, the Senior Superintendent (Operations) of Kowloon East, said that their officers learned about Chow's injuries when they reached the second floor as they swept the building from the ground floor. She said that the firefighters told the police that they had the situation under control and did not require their presence. The police then dispersed the people at the scene with weapons, and left the first-aiders alone to provide care.

=== Emergency services ===
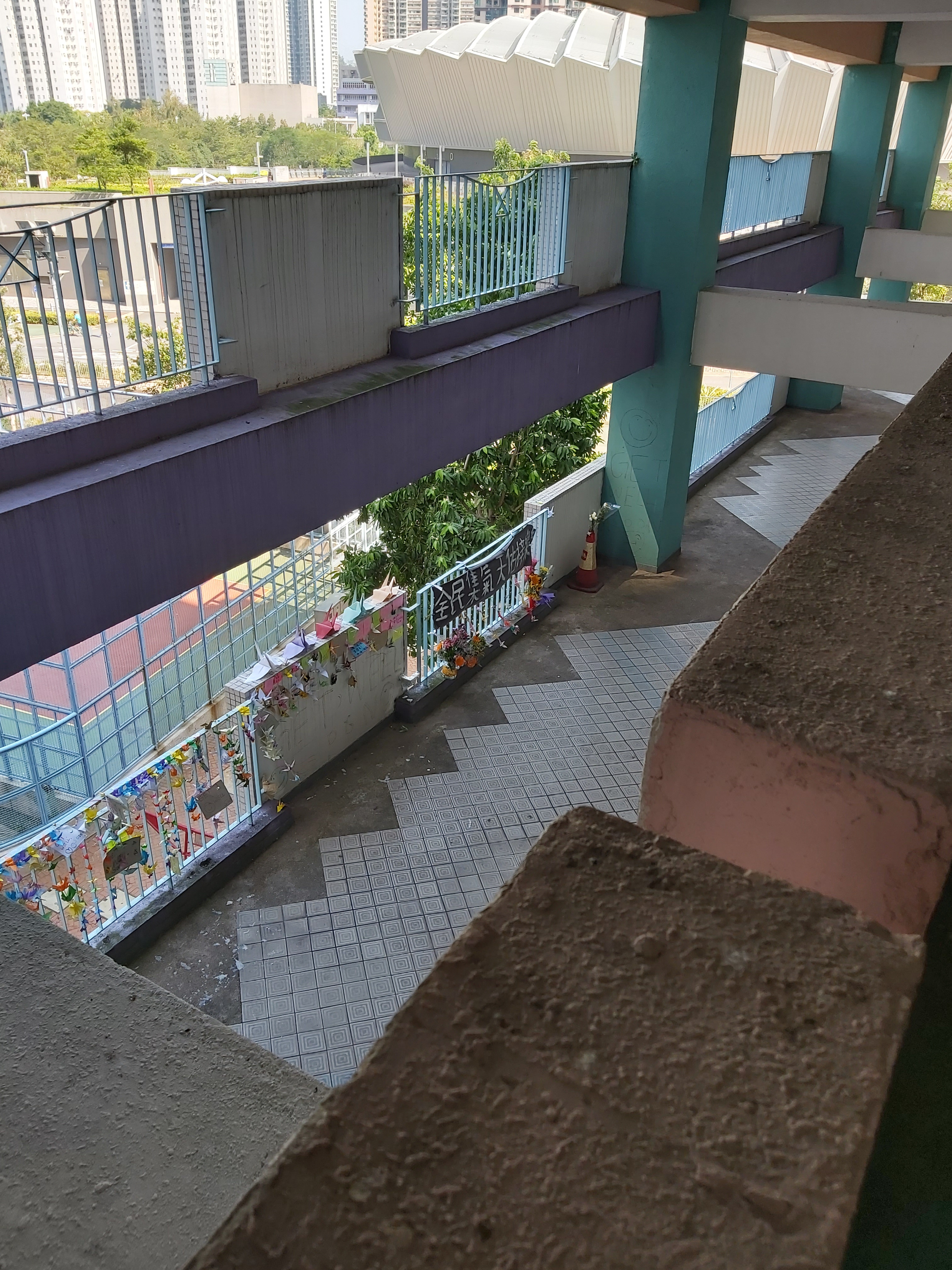
The ledge from which Chow Tsz-lok fell

The Hong Kong Fire Services Department said ambulance A344 from the Po Lam district received an emergency call from firefighters and was redirected at 01:11 to the second floor of the Sheung Tak car park to attend to an urgent case. The ambulance was obstructed by other vehicles including double-decker buses and private cars at the junction of Po Shun Road at Tong Ming Street. At 01:20, finding their way blocked by private cars and fire engines near the Kwong Ying House of the Kwong Ming Court, the ambulance personnel abandoned their vehicle and walked to the scene with their equipment, arriving at their destination at 01:30. The ambulance left with Chow at 01:41 and arrived at the Queen Elizabeth Hospital at 01:59.

Leung Kwok-lai, the Fire Services Department Assistant Chief Ambulance Officer (Kowloon East), said that the ambulance assigned to Chow did not come in contact with any police on duty. He also stated that there were five ambulances deployed for various incidents in the area around that time: ambulance A344 assigned to Chow, two other ambulances handling other cases, while the remaining two ambulances did not handle any patients.

The Fire Services Department said that it took 19 minutes for paramedics to arrive at the scene due to traffic congestion near the car park, seven minutes more than the 12-minute service pledge for emergencies. The police and protesters each blamed the other side for blocking the ambulance from reaching Chow; police vehemently denied responsibility. In an email to HKUST staff and students pledging to take up the matter with police and demand clarification, HKUST president Wei Shyy said: "We saw the footage of ambulances being blocked by police cars and the paramedics walking to the scene, causing a delay of 20 minutes in the rescue operation of our student." However, it was ascertained that the disseminated footage actually depicted ambulance A346, assigned to a person with shortness of breath and back pain.

Chow remained in a critical condition with severe brain injury at the Queen Elizabeth Hospital until his death from cardiac arrest at 08:09 on 8 November 2019. The hospital referred the case to the Coroner's Court.

== Coroner's Court ==
The Coroner's Court held a pre-inquest review on 16 September 2020. The Coroner's Court inquest began on 16 November 2020 and lasted for over a month. For the inquest, 48 witness testimonies and 142 pieces of evidence had been submitted to the court and used for deliberation by the jury.

=== Layout of the car park ===
The court heard that the second floor had four pavements separated by short concrete walls from the parking spaces, but that the third floor had a different layout as the walls were taller and there was no pavement behind the walls. Chow Tak-ming, the father, showed the route that they usually used inside the building on a model. He remarked that Chow fell in a location that was seldom used by their family.

=== Time of the fall ===
The police commandeered video footage from over 30 cameras from the building owner Link REIT, and then asserted that videos showed police entering the car park after the estimated time frame of Chow's fall, thus ruling out that Chow had been pushed by police officers. However, the cause for the fall could not be determined from the footage.

Detective Senior Constable Ngai Kwun-kit, who was tasked with reviewing security footage, said that the fall might have occurred at 01:01:47 due to an abnormal change in the light around the area where Chow was found. He posited that a sudden flash, seen in the footage, was caused by light reflected from Chow as he fell down, but Magistrate Ko Wai-hung remarked that it was too early to confirm whether the flash could indicate the exact timing of Chow's fall. Ngai stated that Chow was alone and not followed by anyone in the footage.

Later, newly unearthed footage from a security camera installed at the Kwong Ming Court, a residential complex near the car park, showed a shadow identified as belonging to Chow as it descended. The moment was timestamped at 00:51:37 in the video, but Ko remarked that this was not the real time. He added that forensic experts had to ascertain the precise time and landing point of the fall based on the footage. Subsequent forensic examination determined the time of the fall as 01:01:48 based on the new footage, corroborating the conclusion of the investigators into the footage at the car park. Ko later stated that he indeed believes that the flash captured in the footage indicated the moment when Chow fell and that the time of the footage matched the other evidence.

=== Instant messages ===
Chow made posts in online group chats on Telegram saying that he was merely at the car park to watch the protest. His final message was "[I] also went down to give something to others." Chow's father said that his last exchange with his son was via WhatsApp at 00:46 to tell his son that police had fired tear gas, to which Chow replied two minutes later to tell his father to close the windows.

=== Protesters and police ===
The Coroner's Court heard that protesters assembled near the Sheung Tak Estate car park and barricaded roads overnight between 3 and 4 November 2019, following online calls to gather outside a nearby hotel where a police officer was holding a wedding banquet.

Senior Inspector Wong Ka-lun said he and his team were tasked with conducting a sweep inside the car park, because black-clad protesters were hurling glass bottles and traffic cones at officers. The barrister representing Chow's family pressed the inspector that he should have realised the need to remove obstacles on the road when he found out that Chow had been injured to facilitate his rapid transfer to the hospital quickly. Wong responded that he judged that it was a higher priority to clear the threat posed by violent protesters so that the paramedics could continue treating the injured person, failing which firefighters and paramedics could have been assaulted. He said his team members had already enquired what had happened and whether rescuers needed help, but were informed their help was not needed. He said that they did not obstruct or harass firefighters or paramedics or get in touch with the injured person during the sweep. Senior Inspector Kwok Chun-hei, who led the other police team, said that they had not been informed of Chow's fall whilst dispersing protesters outside the car park. Both police Wong and Kwok stated that no officers had come in contact with Chow or had given chase to anybody during the incident.

Station Sergeant Lam Wah-ping, who led the police reinforcement, said that he and about 30 colleagues went to offer emergency support to two other teams of officers during the protest in Tseung Kwan O, but had not entered the car park or any other building. He stated that the East Kowloon District police command post had not received information about the incident involving Chow. He said that officers passed by the Sheung Tak Estate car park's ground entrance and reached the T-junction, about 80 metres north of the junction between Tong Ming Street and Tong Chun Street, at 00:58, and that protesters had reoccupied the roads and were throwing objects at officers by the time police were about to retreat at 01:27.

=== Fire Services Department ===
Lai Wai-kit, a firefighter who administered first aid to Chow, revealed that anti-government protesters had unintentionally delayed their arrival by blocking a road leading to Chow's location. News footage played in court showed that two fire engines could not reach the car park due to a roadblock at the junction of Tong Ming Street and Tong Chun Street. Lai declared that his fire engine had to make a U-turn because the road to the car park was obstructed with various objects. A large number of protesters had gathered at that position, but that there had been unintentional obstruction to firefighters.

Cheng Kwun-ming, a senior ambulanceman and the team leader for ambulance A344 assigned to Chow, said that he had asked the team to drive another route to the car park due to a traffic jam on Tong Ming Street and that they were blocked by an illegally-parked vehicle at the Kwong Ying House, so they walked over 100 metres into the parking lot with the stretcher. He estimated that they could have reached the scene 10 minutes earlier if there had been no obstructions and if extra protective equipment had not been necessary. He noted the absence of tear gas and police near Kwong Ying House, and said that the surroundings did not appear dangerous.

Senior ambulanceman Cheng explained that his ambulance (A344) was parked for seven minutes and 56 seconds before the paramedics pushed the stretcher to the parking lot because they needed time to assess the situation at the scene, liaise with firefighters, find the best way to the parking lot, and get the equipment.

=== Local residents and volunteers ===
Mung Wai-kit, the member of the public who found Chow at around 01:03 described the scene of the fall, stating that he did not see anyone chasing others, hear strange sounds, nor notice the pungent smell of tear gas. Photographs and videos by Mung showed that Chow was first tended to by two firefighters shortly after the discovery and that several first aid volunteers offered assistance about 10 minutes later. Mung said that over 20 riot police officers subsequently walked past during their sweep of the car park. He added that some of the officers came forward and yelled at the crowd surrounding Chow, but then left shortly thereafter. One of Mung's videos showed paramedics from the Fire Services Department arriving at 01:29.

Tsui Ka-long, a local resident, said that he looked down from the third floor to see Chow lying in a pool of blood, so he ran and shouted for first aid. He said that in Chow's place, he himself would not have lost his balance as most parts of his body would have been below the concrete wall even if he stood on tiptoes. Mok Hon-pan, another Tseung Kwan O resident, said that he did not see any tear gas smoke nor detect any irritating smell around the area. He stated that police officers were shining flashlights at the building from the adjacent street during the time shortly before Chow was found.

A 17-year-old certified first aider who checked on the injured and accompanied him to hospital in the ambulance said that riot police spoke to the firefighters and ambulancemen at the scene. He added that neighbours were asking the police to leave, while the police did not move forward and did not obstruct the first aid.

=== Medical assessment ===
Mak Hoi-kwan (Calvin Mak), the Queen Elizabeth Hospital neurosurgeon who operated on Chow, estimated from CAT scans that Chow had a 85 percent probability of dying within two weeks at the time of admission, and a 90 percent chance of going into vegetative state or remaining in a permanent deep coma if he did survive. He judged that Chow's prognosis was not dependent on if he had arrived sooner in the hospital. He believes that all the injuries were consistent with a fall from a height of 4.3 metres. He said that he could not determine that Chow was harmed or unconscious before the fall.

Leung Tsz-hang (Ray Leung), a medical doctor who treated Chow, said that he could not rule out the possibility that Chow was thrown off the car park while unconscious, based on the lack of bruises on the hands expected from a person reacting to a fall by placing his hands against the ground, but that the reason for the possible unconsciousness was unclear. However, Beh Swan-lip (Philip Beh), a forensic doctor who observed the autopsy, said that Chow did have palm bruises, even though the hospital report did not state any injuries to the palm, but that the ICU doctors may not have looked at it as the injuries were small, non-fatal, and non-important. The expert witness Kong Kam-fu (James Kong), an orthopedic doctor, commented about the bruises on both palms, surmising that it may have been caused by Chow lifting himself up with his left or both hands on the edge, rather than with his right hand alone, and falling to the side if he jumped with his left hand on the edge. Leung said that Chow had no arm fractures, which suggested that Chow was unable to reflexively extend his arms for protection during the fall. He said that the injuries were likely caused by a collision of great force such as falling from height, but also deemed that the injuries could either be from that or an assault. He added that there was no signs indicating that Chow inhaled tear gas or was hit by bullets. He found the scenario that Chow lost his balance and could not react in time by using his hands unlikely. Wong stated that Chow most probably fell from a height by accident, rather than being attacked and thrown off the wall. He said that Chow landed with the right side of his head first and that his left brain was bruised by the counter-impact force, similar to what happened with the chest and pelvic injuries. He said that the injuries did not look like that from an attack, there was no DNA from other people under his fingernails, and there was no evidence that Chow had been attacked. He also explained that Chow was unlikely to have been thrown based on the horizontal distance of 1.3 metres between Chow and the wall. He further explained that Chow's fall from the height of 4.3 meters took around 0.93 seconds based on his calculations and that people's perception reaction time is about 0.5 to 0.7 seconds, meaning that Chow did not have sufficient time to react to the fall. He added that the 0.7-second perception reaction time is based on results from laboratory experiments, but that this is in reality more than one second for the average person.

The expert witness Tse Man-li, a clinical toxicologist, concluded that Chow's death is not related to intoxication by tear gas fired by police. He stated that Chow's medical report did not record any signs of exposure to tear gas, such as at the nose or eyes. He noted that medical workers would have been affected as well if Chow was tear gassed, but no medical workers had noticed this during the rescue and thus the odds of Chow being tear gassed is slim. He said there was no trace of pepper spray or cyanide, a chemical found in tear gas, found in the blood and body fluid samples taken during the hospitalization and autopsy. A juror asked whether tear gas could have reach the destination due to the wind or could have filled out the third floor within one minute, but Tse responded that the tear gas was not affected by wind based on the footage showing the smoke rising upwards and that it is unlikely to diffuse at such a speed.

=== Forensic assessment ===
It was reported that Chow had a fractured right pelvis from likely a lateral compression, a torn internal iliac artery, a fractured skull base, bleeding in mainly the right half of the brain, and an intra-abdominal hemorrhage. He had no obvious injuries to his hands and feet, nor had he been shot with bullets or was he bruised from a beating. The toxicology results only showed drugs administered after his admission to the hospital.

Kwok Ka-kei, a forensic doctor who performed the autopsy, stated that she found no signs that Chow had been shot, burnt, or assaulted. She also found no trace of tear gas or pepper spray. She believes that the cause of death was the head injury. She explained that Chow had a brain coup injury on the right side and a brain contrecoup injury on the left side, determined to be caused by a moving head hitting on a hard and non-deformed surface, such as by falling from a height and hitting the right side of the head against the ground. She stated that the injuries to the chest and pelvis could have occurred under the same circumstances, and that they were consistent with injuries caused by falling from the third floor to the second floor of the parking lot. She further explained that there was no injury that pointed to an attack, whereas cases of killings would have shown a skull recess caused by the weapon and no contrecoup injury. She stated that the injuries would have to be serious for Chow to be beaten unconscious, which would have left traces of the murder weapon, but there was no sight of injuries caused by an attack.

Beh Swan-lip (Philip Beh), a forensic doctor who was appointed by Chow's parents and watched the autopsy, agreed that Chow's injuries could not be caused by anything other than falling. He believes that the fatal injuries were located at the head and brain. He stated that the injuries were concentrated at the right side of the body, adding that the right side of the head and pelvic bone was severely hit. He reported that the injuries do not appear to be caused by a murder weapon. He added that the skull would be broken if the head was attacked by a hammer or stick. He also added that an indistinguishable lineair fracture could have formed if the flat part of a brick was used to hit the head, but that this would have needed planning to get these injuries to overlap with the fall injuries. He deemed the possibility of overlapping injuries by an attack and fall to be low.

Cheng Yuk-ki, a senior government chemist in charge of forensic analysis, believes that Chow's fall was accidental, rather than that Chow was attacked and thrown off the wall. He was involved in mapping out the interior of the car park for stereoscopic animation in virtual reality for the court, as jury visits to the site was avoided due to the COVID-19 pandemic. He explained that the layout of the second and third floor is similar, which may have caused the confusion that the wall on the third floor was the same as the wall on the second floor, that is, connected to a sidewalk. He remarked that the surveillance footage showed that other people also had tried to cross the same wall in other locations, but that they found that there was no pedestrian path behind the wall and that nothing had happened.

Cheng said that he conducted an on-site experiment to test the hypothesis that the flash on the footage at 1:01:47 indicated the moment of Chow's fall, an experiment that resulted in a similar flash in live footage when a dummy was being thrown from the third to the second floor. He concluded that the flash on the footage was indeed caused by Chow's fall. He stated that the footage of the flash and the footage of the shadow falling appeared to show the same moment.

Cheng stated that Chow was last captured on footage at 01:01:39 while walking from the second floor to the third floor along the ramp. He said that it is possible, based on Chow's walking pace, that Chow had walked 15 metres from the place where he was last captured on camera at 01:01:39 to the 1.2-metre-high wall where he fell eight seconds later. He added that no one else had been captured by cameras on the third floor for seven seconds before the incident. When asked whether Chow could have been attacked within the eight seconds, Cheng stated that there is no evidence that supports such a hypothesis. He explained that it is difficult for someone who wants to ambush Chow to hide from being captured by the cameras as the cameras rotate randomly, adding that the culprit would have to calculate the exact time of Chow walking up to the third floor and complete the whole attack within eight seconds, which is difficult to accomplish. He believes that it is impossible that someone could have attacked, lifted, and thrown Chow over the wall within the eight seconds.

=== Summary and verdict ===
The Coroner's Court inquest concluded with an open verdict, as the jury was unable to make a determination about the death in the case. This was reached by a four to one majority. In addition, they agreed that the cause of death was the head injury due to a fall from a height.

== Responses in Hong Kong ==
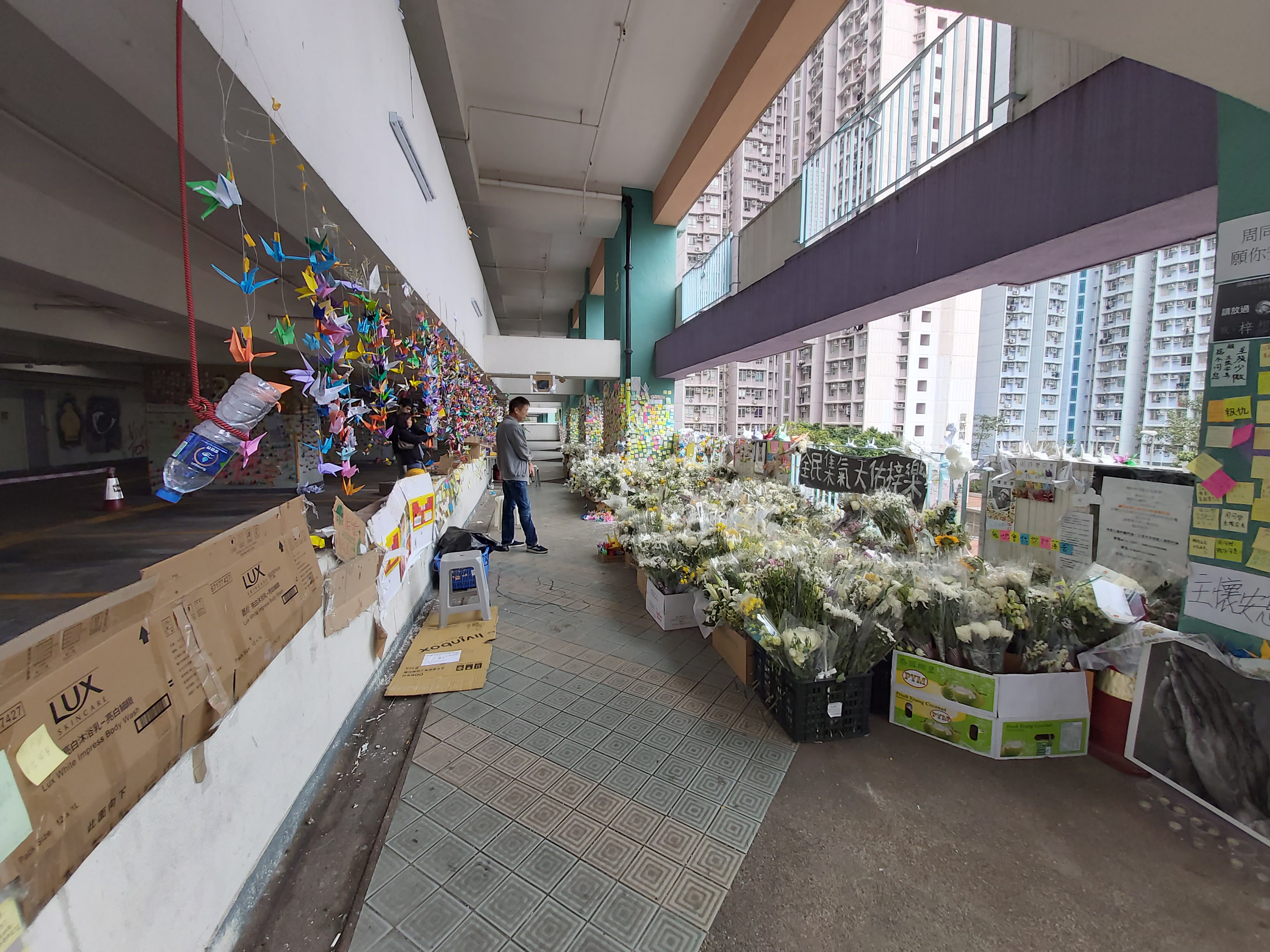
A shrine at the place where Chow fell, 12 November 2019

While the Hong Kong government expressed "great sorrow and regret" over Chow's death and extended sympathies to his family on 8 November 2019, and promised a "comprehensive investigation to find out what happened", the death sparked heightened anger among protesters, repeated calls for revenge by protesters, and the escalation of protester violence. Bloomberg reported that "online rumors, fake news and propaganda from both sides of the political divide" were rife despite the police's role in the death of Chow being unsubstantiated. There were posts alleging that Chow had been chased and even pushed by an undercover officer, and that police blocked an ambulance from reaching him, thus depriving him of life-saving medical care.

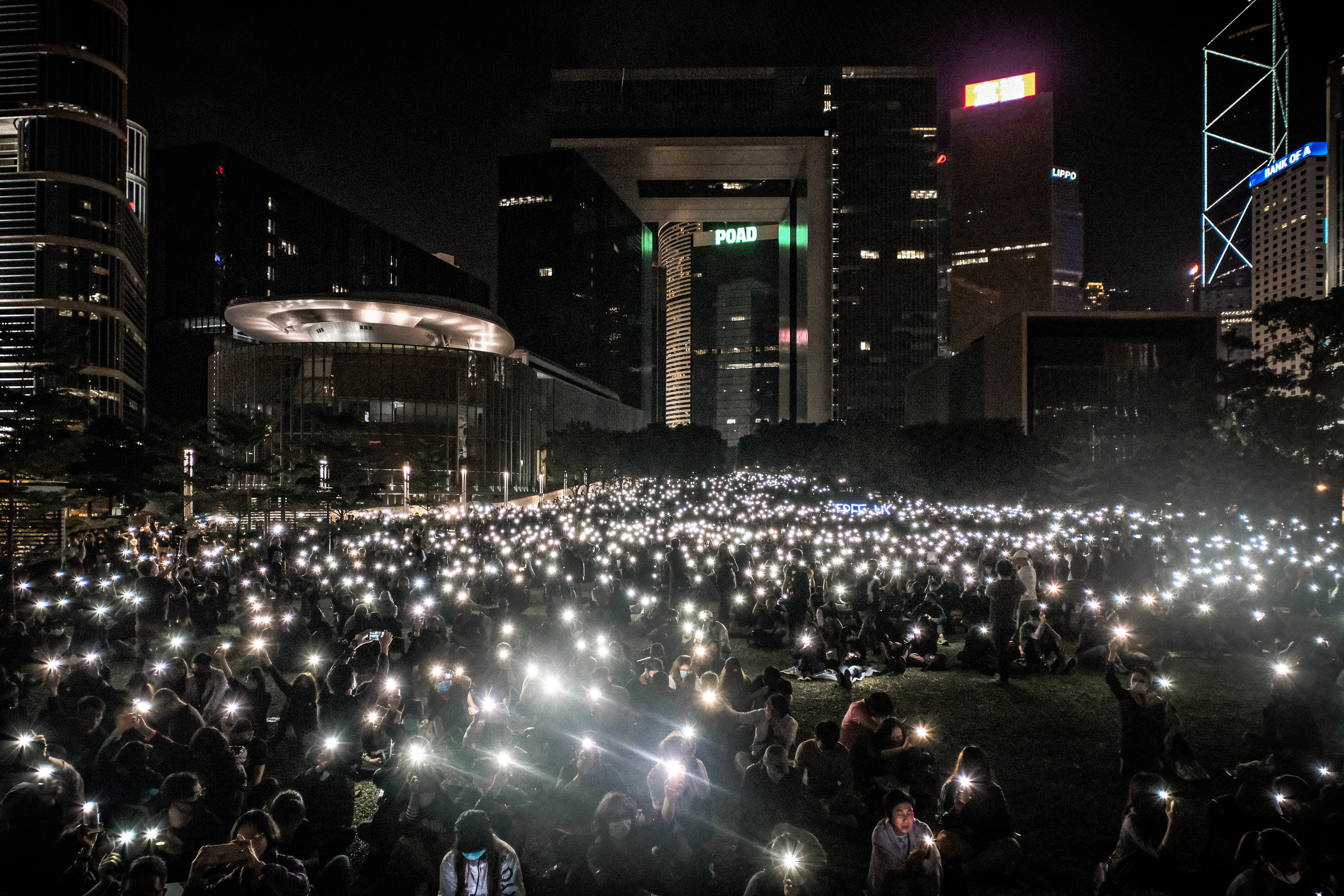
A memorial for Chow in Tamar Park on 9 November

During a 6 November forum at HKUST to discuss Chow's incident, a student from mainland China was set upon by a crowd of protesters and repeatedly hit on the head. HKUST president Wei Shyy denounced the violence.

On 8 November, the place where Chow had fallen became a shrine: many people queued up to place offerings of flowers, candles, and paper cranes. About a thousand protesters marched in the central business district chanting anti-police slogans and shouting at the police, including calling them "murderers". In several locations around Hong Kong, protesters blocked roads, lit fires, and vandalised Mass Transit Railway stations, while the police responded with tear gas. A graduation ceremony at HKUST on that day was cut short when masked students dressed in black took the stage and turned it into a memorial service for Chow. A vigil was held the next day in Tamar Park with a claimed attendance of 100,000, while police put that figure at 7,500.

On 11 November, student protesters marched to the residence of HKUST president Shyy and called on him to "condemn police violence"; they daubed graffiti and vandalised the residence and also vandalised a Starbucks café and Bank of China branch on campus. Classes at HKUST were cancelled for repairs after mass vandalism on the campus. Shyy demanded a "thorough and independent investigation" into Chow's death.

The death of Chow ignited an escalation of violent protests, initiating the so-called "Blossom Everywhere" campaign from 11 November onward in which protesters established roadblocks, disrupted train services, and vandalised public spaces across the city. This would ultimately lead to conflicts where a protester was shot in Sai Wan Ho, a man was doused and set on fire in Ma On Shan, and an elderly man was killed after he was hit with a brick in Sheung Shui, eventually culminating in large-scale police sieges on university campuses, namely at the Chinese University of Hong Kong and the Hong Kong Polytechnic University.

In a "citizen's press conference" held by protesters following the news of Chow's death, demonstrators said: "In this tragic moment, we plead to all to bear in heart and mind who the real culprits behind Tsz-lok's death were. His fall was not an unfortunate accident. It was an intentional manslaughter executed by tyranny and the police force."

=== Others ===
Man-Kei Tam, the director of Amnesty International Hong Kong, called for an independent and urgent investigation into the events leading to Chow's fall, including into the allegations that the police delayed the ambulance. The activist Joshua Wong said that Chow's death made the demand for an independent investigation into police conduct even more crucial, stating that "Reforming the Hong Kong police force has become a big demand in the society," and asserted that "Obviously, the Hong Kong police force has to be accountable for Chow's death." The Hong Kong Human Rights Monitor observed the absence of trust between police and the public and thus urged the coroner to "proactively investigate, and take additional measures to ensure the credibility of the investigation."

In an open letter, HKUST president Wei Shyy called for a thorough and independent investigation into Chow's death, and a clarification from all parties and especially the police to the cause of the ambulance delay. The provisional president of the HKUST student union, Lai Wai-chun, said that he hoped that the university authorities could investigate the reasons for Chow's death and the alleged delay in emergency medical personnel reaching Chow. The police responded to Shyy's open letter, stating the following points: the Regional Crime Unit of Kowloon East was investigating the case and would do so in depth; the police had recommended a death inquest and would submit a death investigation report to the coroner; the Fire Services Department clarified that the ambulance had no interaction with police officers at the scene, but was obstructed by buses and private cars and not by police vehicles.

== Funeral and public tribute ==
An article published by Next Magazine alleged that Po Fook Memorial Hall, which supposedly had been approached by Chow's mother to organise her son's funeral arrangements, had declined to hold Chow's funeral ceremony and said that the entire funeral services sector would not help her. The funeral parlour denied the report. A public service was held there on the evening of 12 December. Thousands of mourners, including members of the public, queued until late into the night to pay their respects.

On 25 February 2020, the Sai Kung District Council, whose responsibility covers the area where Chow died, announced a meeting on 3 March for which eight members of the council had submitted for discussion a motion to rename two resting places in the Tseung Kwan O district "Chow Tsz-lok Memorial Park" and "Chan Yin-lam Memorial Park". This motion was controversial, with some members of the public condemning the disrespect to the deceased and their families, who had not been consulted; two of the proposers reportedly received abusive messages on their social media pages.

== See also ==
- Death of Chan Yin-lam
- Death of Luo Changqing
