= Timeline of the 2019–2020 Hong Kong protests (November 2019) =

November events of the 2019–2020 pro-democracy demonstrations in Hong Kong

Timeline of the 2019–2020 Hong Kong protests
2019			March–June				July	August	September	October	November	December
2020	January	February	March	April	May	June	July	August	September	October	November	December
2021	January	February	March	April	May	June	July	August	September–November			December

The month of November 2019 in the 2019–2020 Hong Kong protests started with protesting in malls and police getting into homes and malls to arrest protesters. The death of Chow Tsz-lok in Sheung Tak, Tseung Kwan O had led to more protests. In mid November, there were city-wide strikes which lasted for more than a week. Hong Kong Police officers fired tear gas in Chinese University of Hong Kong (CUHK), Hong Kong Polytechnic University (PolyU), and nearby areas. In late November, the District Council elections were held. The pro-democracy camp in conjunction with the localist groups got more than 80 per cent of the seats and gained control of 17 out of 18 District Councils.

== Events ==
=== 1 November ===
More than 100 people staged a flash mob protest in Central despite being confronted by police officers who warned the group they risked being prosecuted. They carried a huge yellow banner calling for an end to "police brutality", as they occupied one side of the road.

=== 2 November ===
Protests took place in Causeway Bay, Wan Chai, Central and Tsim Sha Tsui on 2 November, each of which is described below:

==== Causeway Bay election rally ====
128 pro-democracy candidates organised election rallies on the central lawn of Victoria Park, although the police had earlier banned rallies at that location. The candidates argued that, according to Chapter 9.11 of the Guidelines on Election-related Activities in respect of the District Council Election, the police would not need to be informed if pre-election meetings consisted of fewer than 50 supporters. In the early afternoon, thousands of people entered Victoria Park. At 3:15 pm, the police declared that the people were participating in an illegal assembly and warned them to leave immediately. Most of the people ignored the police warning, and continued to walk to Victoria Park.

Subsequently, some protesters built road blocks nearby. In response, the police fired multiple rounds of tear gas into the Park. Tear gas was also fired outside Hong Kong Central Library and Sogo Hong Kong. After that, protesters left Causeway Bay for Tin Hau and Wan Chai. Police used tear gas and water cannon to disperse the crowd in Wan Chai. Some protesters set up road blocks in Wan Chai and vandalised the Queen's Road East branch of state-run Xinhua News Agency.

==== Central rally ====
Two rallies, to which the police did not object, took place in the afternoon at Edinburgh Place and Chater Garden in Central. Soon after both rallies had begun, the police ordered the organisers to end the rallies immediately at 5:10 pm and to ask all participants to leave by 5:30 pm. By evening violence in Causeway Bay had spread to Central: Protesters threw Molotov cocktails on Lung Wo Road, and set up barricades on Connaught Road Central, blocking traffic; police fired tear gas to disperse protesters. A Yoshinoya branch was trashed, and Central MTR station was closed after protesters vandalised several exits. An argument started between a firefighter and police when the former accused police of hitting his firetruck with a tear gas projectile. Amidst the tension, the police pushed the firefighter, then pepper sprayed journalists filming the scene and pushed them away. A first-aider suffered severe back burns after reportedly being hit by a tear gas canister.

On 12 December 2023, four who had taken part in the rallies were jailed for between 35 and 45 months after having been convicted of rioting and other offences.

==== Tsim Sha Tsui rally ====
A rally at 4 pm in Park Lane Shopper's Boulevard was attended by a hundred participants who sang protest songs. Some protesters shouted slogans and wore face masks. A large squad of riot police arrived at the rally from Tsim Sha Tsui Police Station. They threatened to arrest those wearing face masks and disperse the crowds. After quarrels with protesters, the police stood down and returned to the police station.

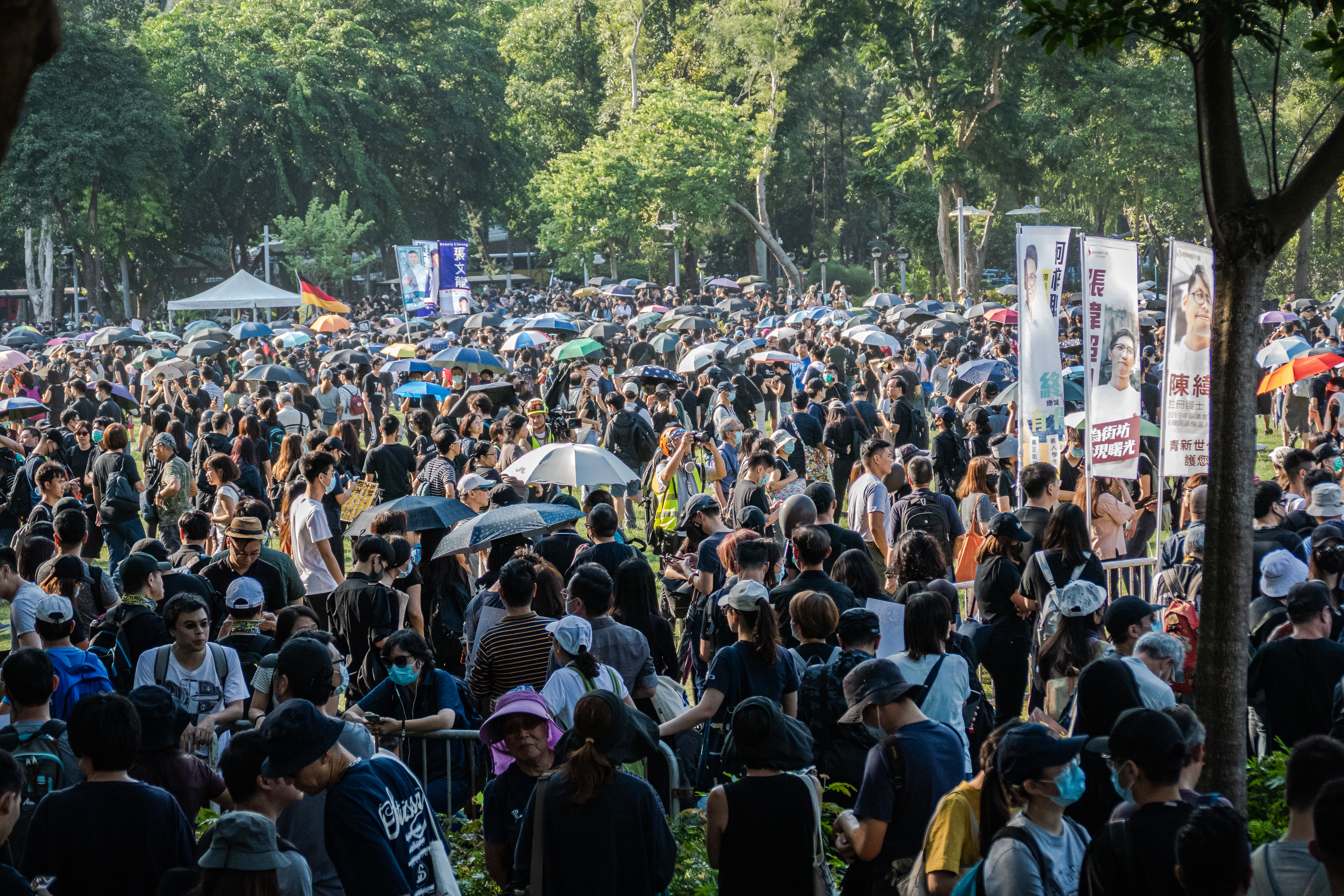
Protesters holding banners and umbrellas

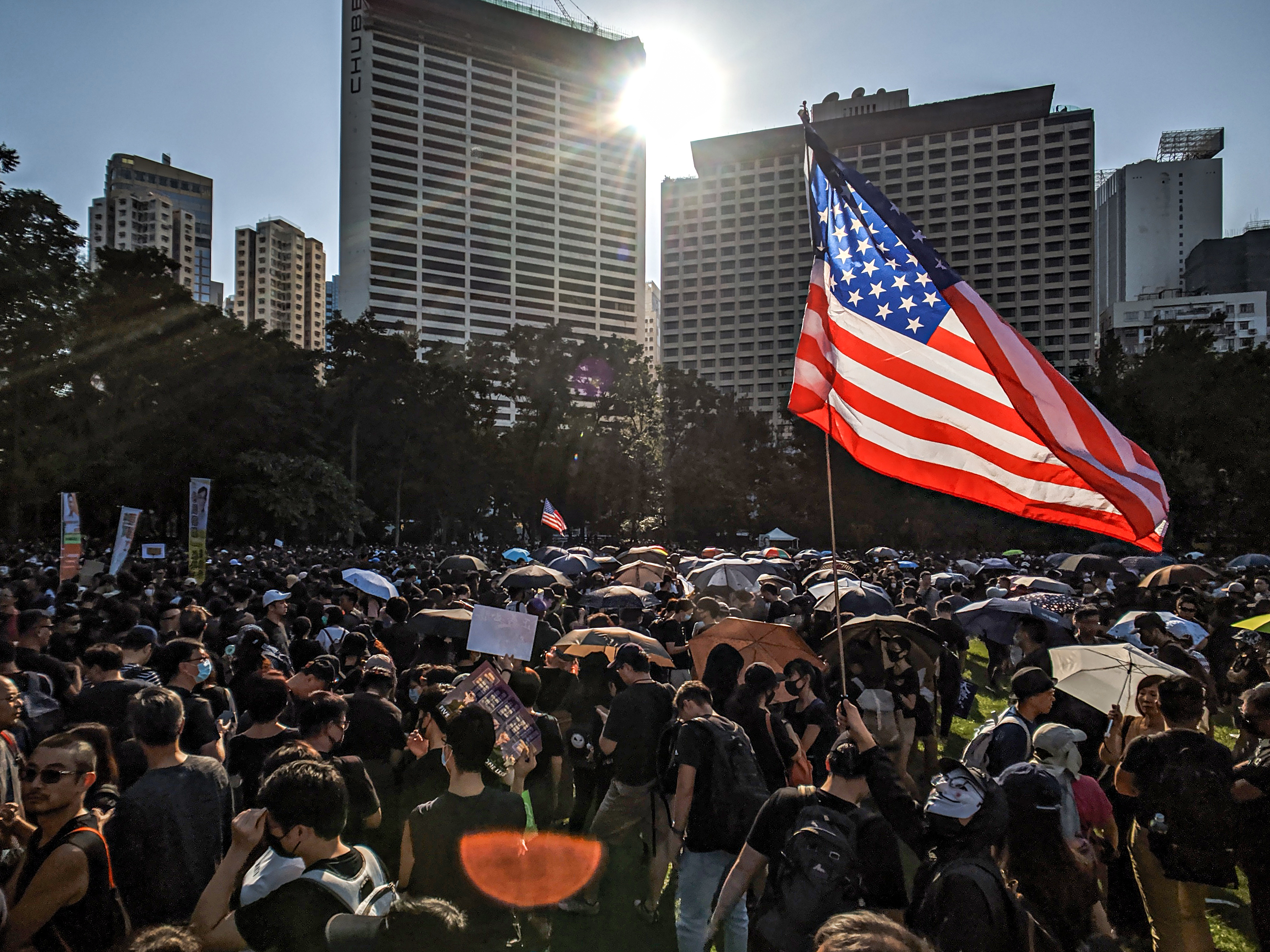
A protester waving the American flag

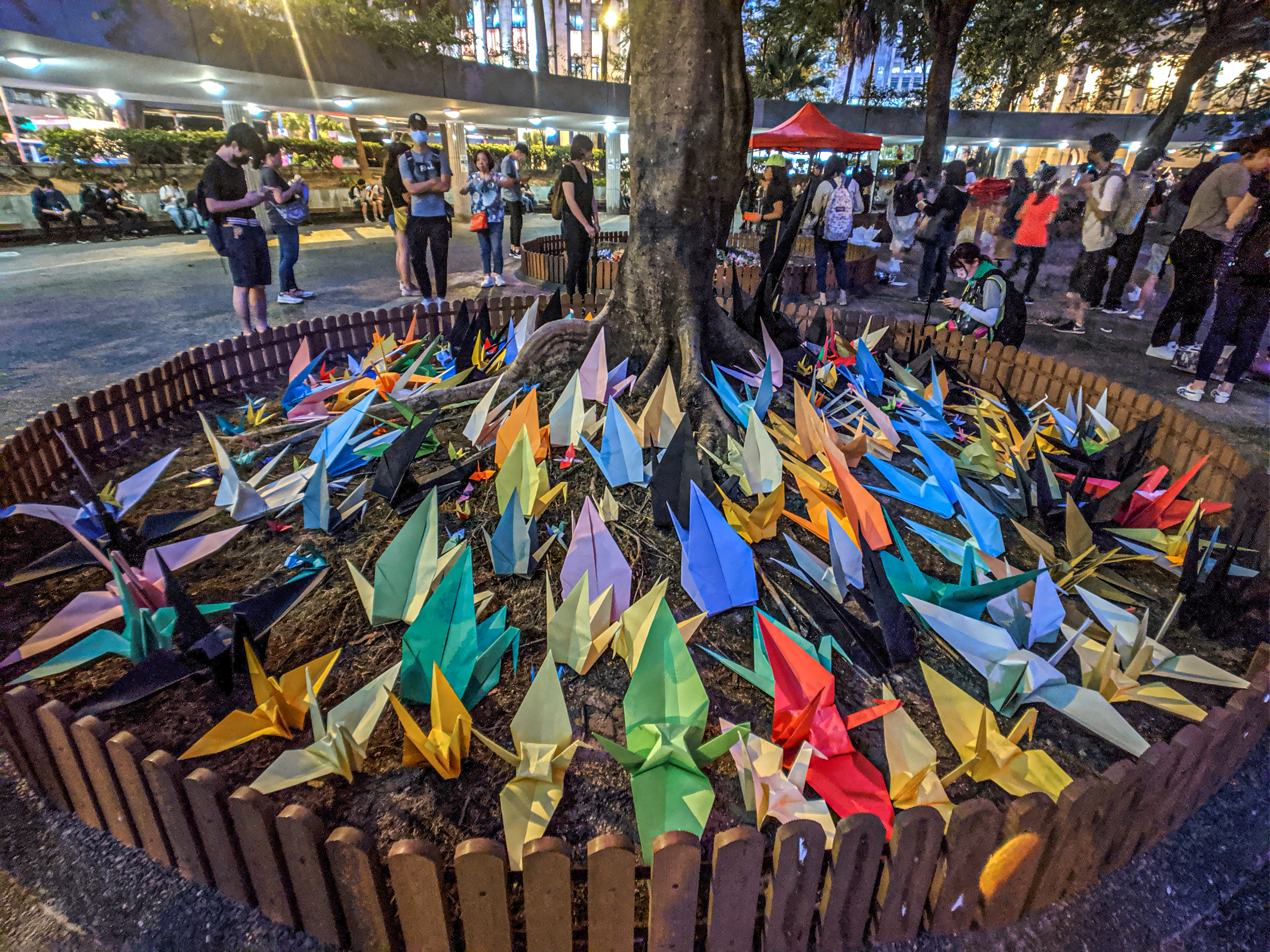
Origami by the protesters

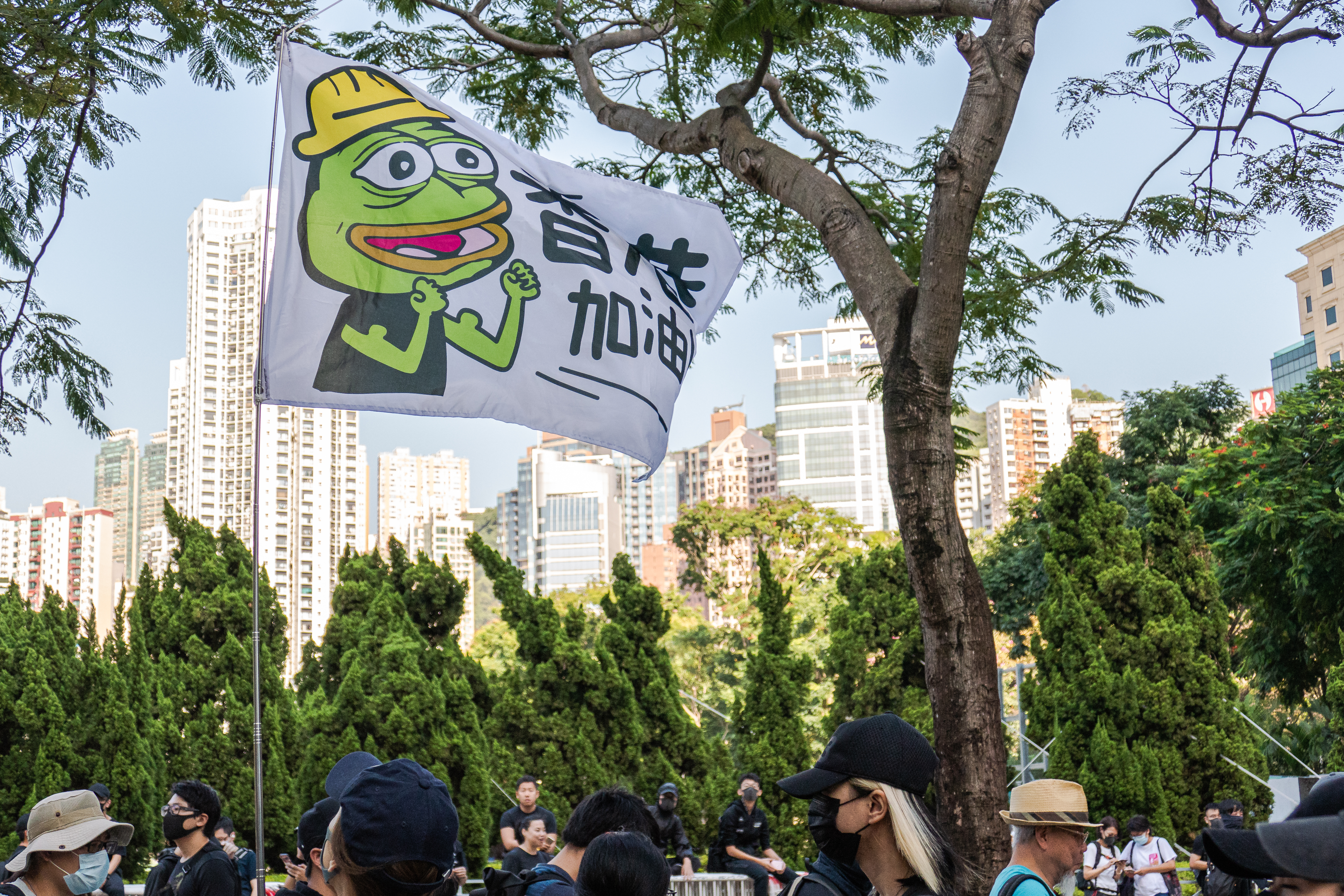
A protester waving a flag with Pepe the Frog on it

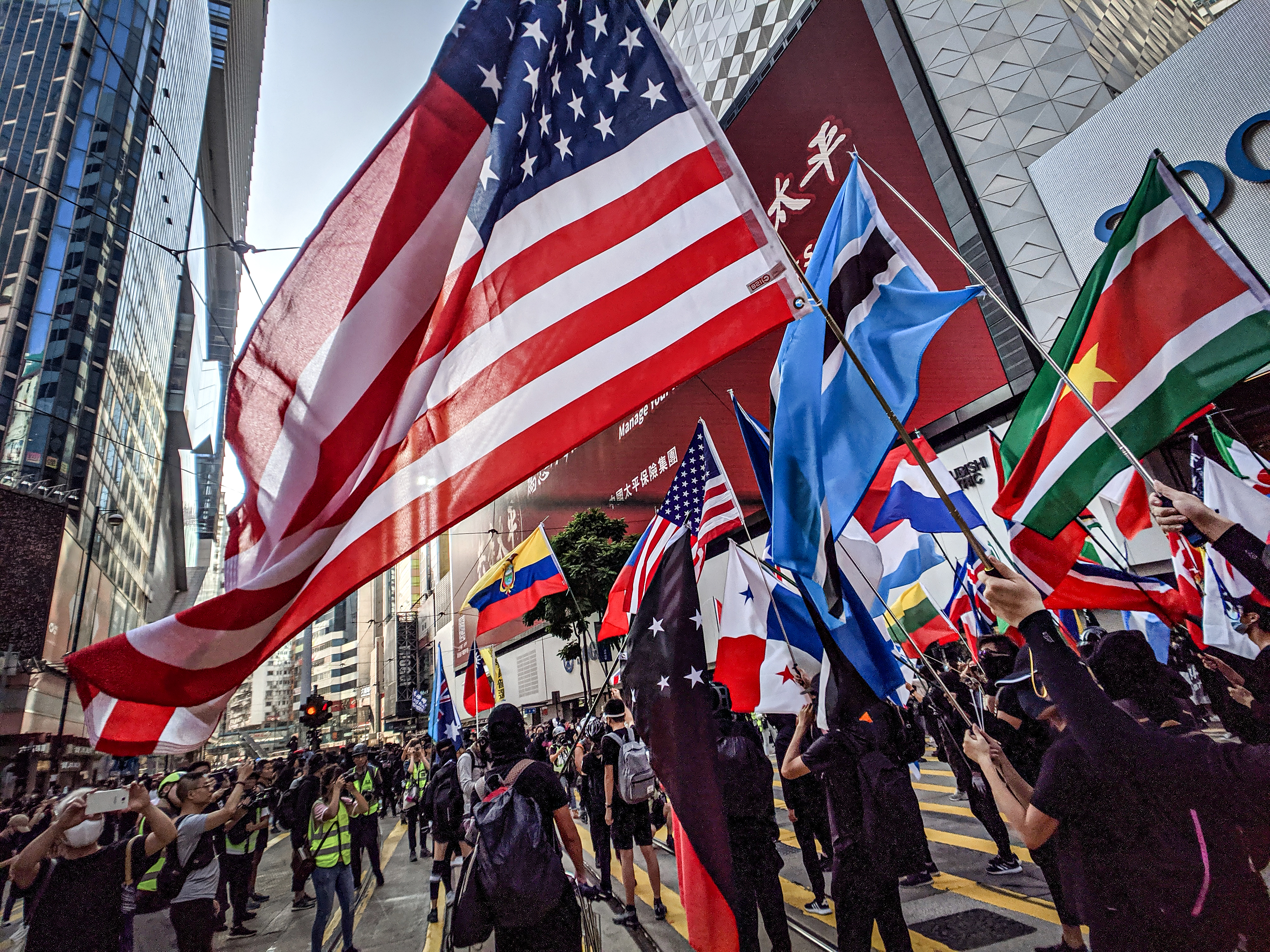
Protesters waving flags from various countries

=== 3 November mall sit-ins ===
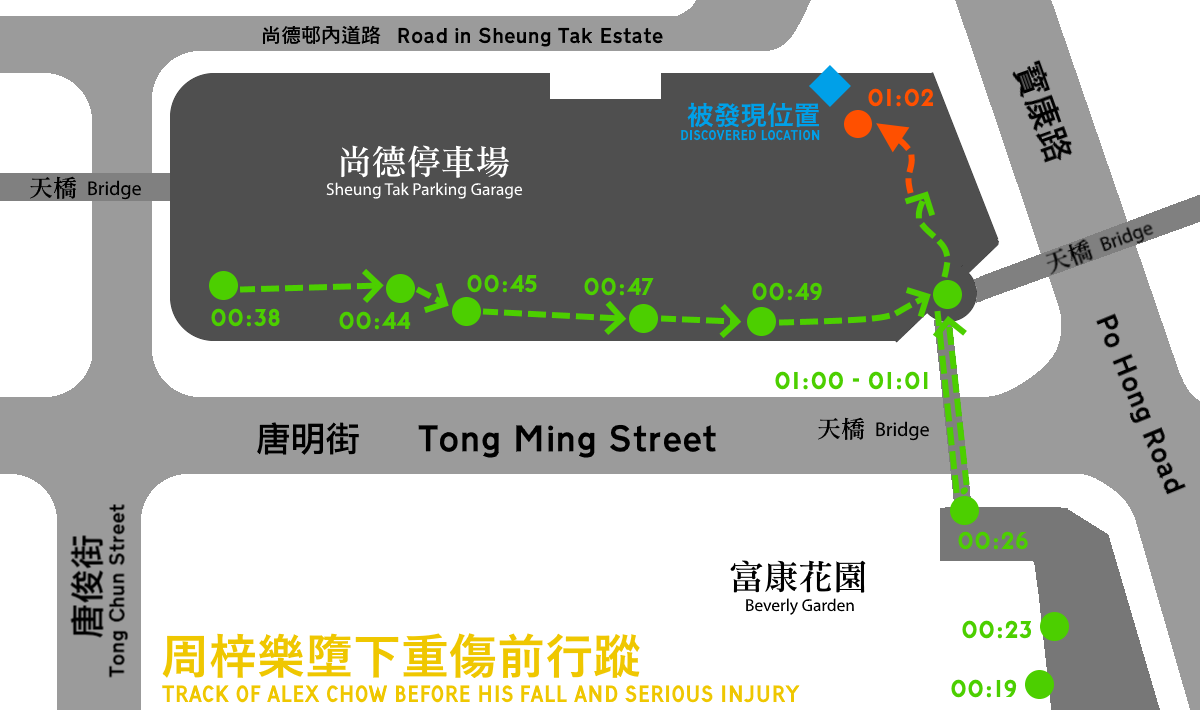
Alex Chow Tsz-lok was found unconscious after falling from third floor of the parking garage

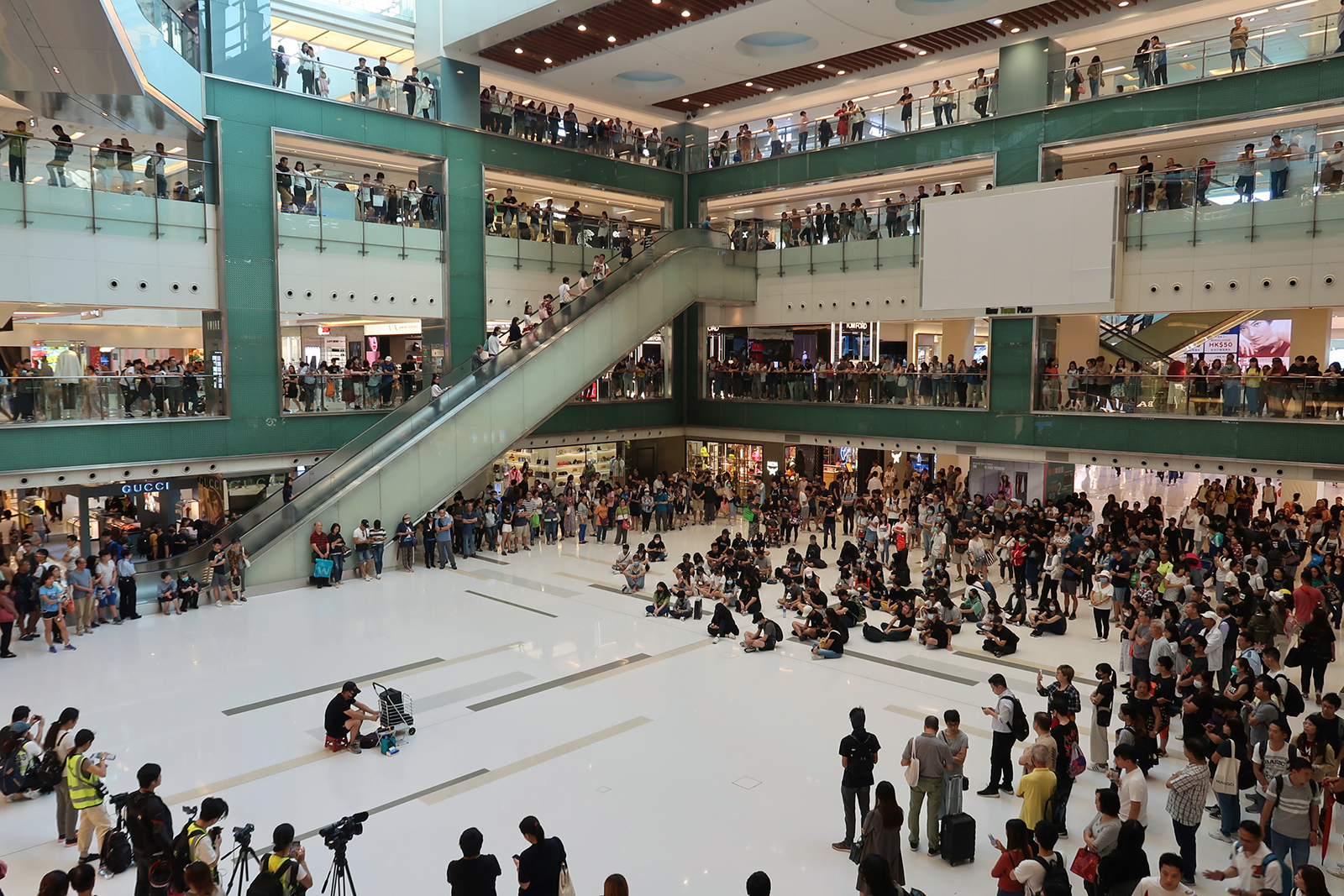
Protesters in the NTP Atrium

Several sit-in protests were held at shopping malls across Hong Kong. One took place around Cityplaza, a mall in the eastern part of Hong Kong Island, early in the evening. Entrances of two restaurants were spray painted. Outside Cityplaza, a Mandarin-speaking man slashed several people with a knife. The police stormed into the plaza. Outside the mall, Andrew Chiu, a Democratic Party district councillor representing Tai Koo Shing West, had his left ear bitten off by the man. A crowd then punched and kicked the man in retaliation. Joey Kwok, a freelance photojournalist working for Stand News, and Tang Chak-man, a journalism student at Hong Kong Baptist University and a member of its Students' Union Editorial Board, were both arrested while reporting at the scene. Stand News described the arrest as unreasonable, saying in a statement that Kwok was wearing a press vest, filming the police from a distance when he was surrounded and subdued by riot officers. Roland Chin, the head of Baptist University, said he was "deeply concerned" with the well-being of Tang, noting that university staff and a lawyer had been sent to assist the student.

Private details of a police officer's wedding in Tseung Kwan O were leaked. Protesters set up road blocks and threw objects at the police. Police attempted to disperse the crowd by firing tear gas rounds. Chow Tsz-lok, a 22-year-old student at the Hong Kong University of Science and Technology, was later found unconscious on the second floor of a nearby car park after plunging from the third floor in the early hours of 4 November.

=== 4 November ===
Six reporters staged a silent protest at a routine police press conference. They each wore a safety helmet with one Chinese character, which, when combined, read "investigate police violence, stop police lies" (Chinese: 查警暴止警謊). The police stopped its online live stream two minutes later and cancelled the entire press conference 20 minutes later. Bon Ko, Police Public Relations Branch superintendent, suspended the conference as the reporters refused to either take off their helmets or leave the venue. Later that day, the police staged a live broadcast on Facebook to express their views on the protests over the weekend.

Five defendants, aged between 19 and 24, were charged with possessing explosive substances after Molotov cocktails were found in a flat in Wan Chai. Three attended the hearing at the Eastern Magistrates' Courts while two remained hospitalised. Charges had to be dropped due to a spelling error by the Department of Justice. Upon the release of the trio, they were immediately re-arrested by a dozen officers in riot gear who had entered the court building, while more than 100 police officers were waiting outside the premises. The defence counsel argued that the arrests inside court premises without the magistrate's approval constituted contempt of court. The judiciary responded that the ground floor was a public area and not under its management.

=== 5 November Tsim Sha Tsui rally ===
Over a thousand people in Guy Fawkes masks attended a flash gathering at 8 pm at the Urban Council Centenary Garden, Tsim Sha Tsui to mark the one month anniversary of the introduction of the Hong Kong's anti-mask law. The exact venue of the gathering was only announced thirty minutes before the start. The crowd occupied roads around the gardenand a few shops vandalised; Hunghom Café, a restaurant seen as pro-government, was targeted. At 9 pm, the police deployed a water cannon truck to the area, firing tear liquid at the crowd, some of which were reporters.

Crowds gathered near Kwong Ming Court and Sheung Tak Estate in Tseung Kwan O late at night to express dissatisfaction over the severe injuries suffered by a 22-year-old Chow Tsz-lok two days before. Police fired tear gas at protesters in response to the blockade of roads started by protesters.

=== 8 November ===
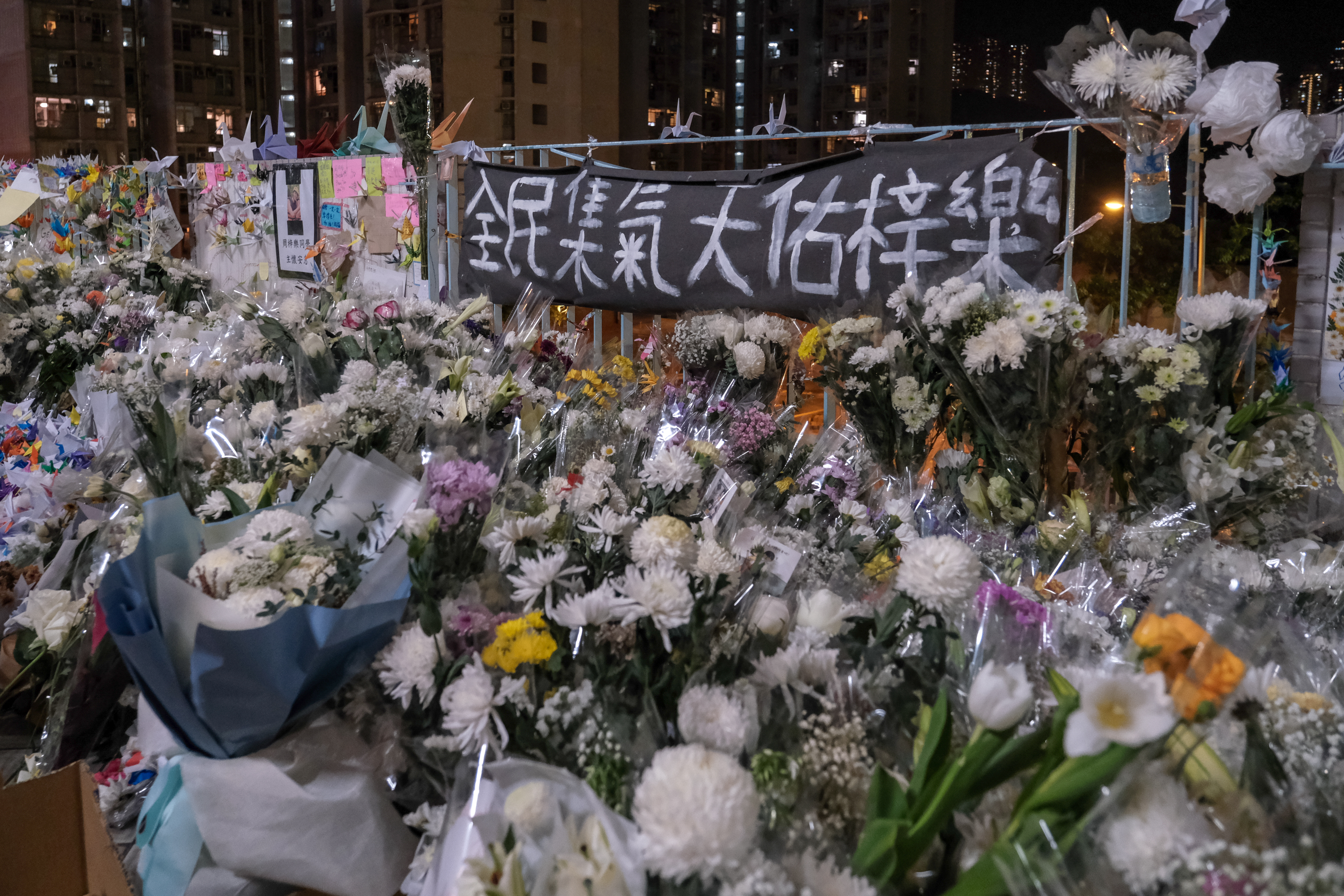
Protesters laid flowers for Chow Tsz-lok

Chow Tsz-lok died at 8:09 am at the age of 22, after succumbing to a cardiac arrest, as a result of fall injuries sustained on 4 November. The police were criticised for intentionally obstructing the paramedics from attending to him, causing a delay in treatment, as it took the ambulance 19 minutes to reach Chow, seven minutes longer than their service pledge of 12 minutes; however, the police denied that they obstructed paramedics. Leung Kwok-lai, the Fire Services Department Assistant Chief Ambulance Officer (Kowloon East) stated that the ambulance assigned to Chow was blocked by buses and private vehicles but that the ambulance did not come in contact with the police that were on duty.

During the 2020 Coroner's Court inquest, Lai Wai-kit, a firefighter who administered first aid to Chow, testified that anti-government protesters delayed their arrival by blocking a road leading to Chow's location, but believed this to have been unintentional. In another testimony, Cheng Kwun-ming, a senior ambulanceman and the team leader for ambulance A344 assigned to Chow, clarified that he had asked the team to drive another route to the parking lot due to a traffic jam on Tong Ming Street, but that they were blocked by an illegally-parked vehicle at the Kwong Ying House and thus walked over 100 metres into the parking lot with their equipment. He said that they did not see the police nearby when they arrived at the Kwong Ying House.

Angered and saddened by the news of the death, students from HKUST vandalised several stores perceived to be pro-Beijing and the residence of HKUST president Wei Shyy, demanding him to condemn police brutality. Shyy later released an open letter demanding the government to conduct "thorough and independent investigation" regarding Chow's death. Flash mob rallies mourning the death of Chow were held in various districts including Kwun Tong and Central during lunch hours.

At night, thousands of mourners returned to the car park of Sheung Tak Estate and laid down flowers and origami for the deceased student. Meanwhile, protesters began clashing with the police in Causeway Bay and Mong Kok. At the junction of Hamilton Street and Nathan Road in Yau Ma Tei, the police fired a warning shot to the sky.

=== 9 November vigil ===
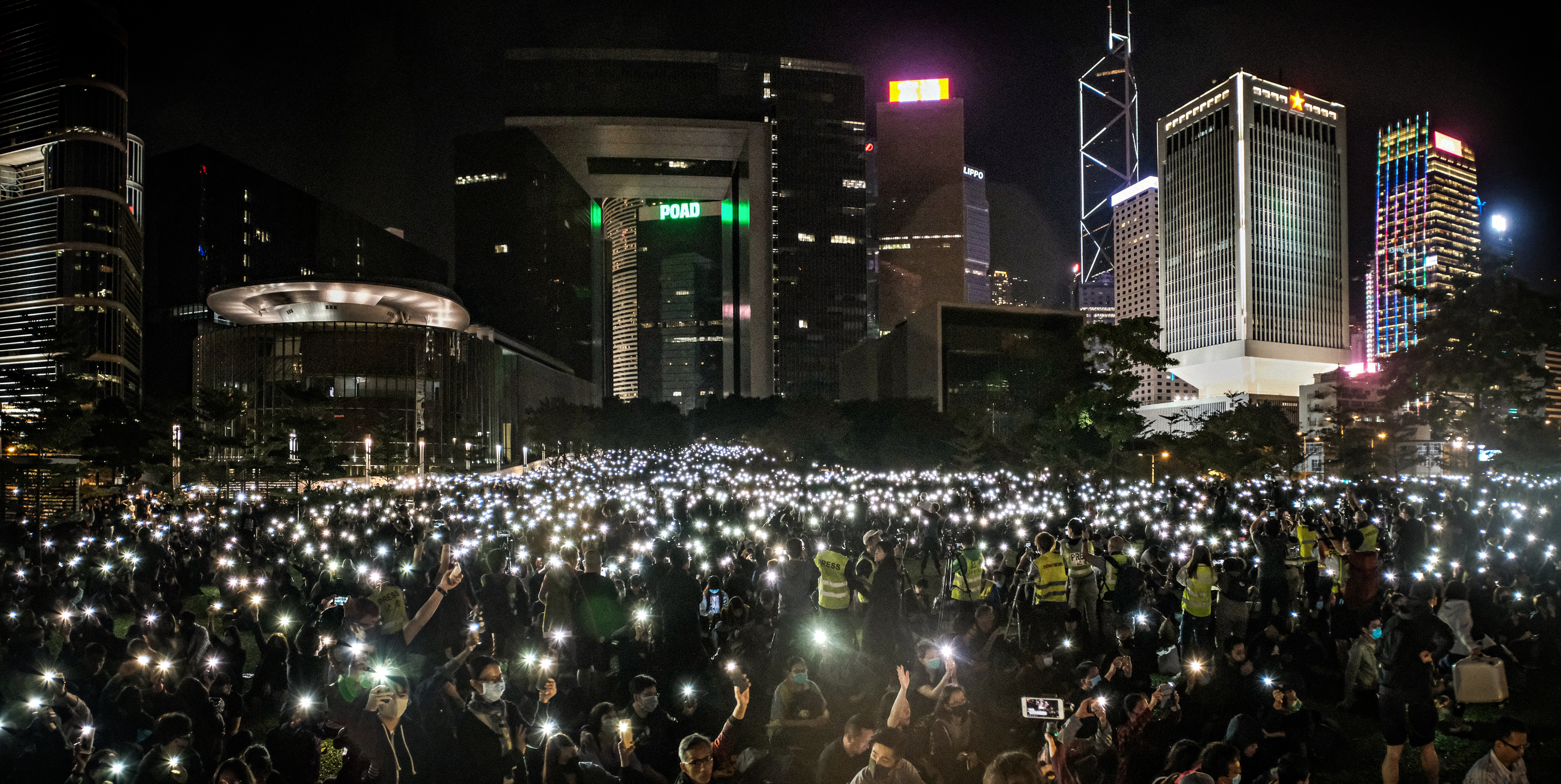
Protesters at night (9 December)

Thousands of people gathered in Tamar Park at night to mourn "martyrs" who had died for the protests. They prayed for the deceased and chanted slogans urging Hong Kong people to take revenge. The organiser claimed that 100,000 people attended the vigil, while the police put the figure at 7,500.

=== 10 November ===
Protesters gathered in various shopping malls in Hong Kong including New Town Plaza in Sha Tin, and Festival Walk in Kowloon Tong, responding online calls to "shop" in these malls. Conflicts first erupted in Sha Tin when protesters vandalised the Sha Tin station and trashed a Maxim restaurant. Inside Festival Walk, protesters vandalised the branch of SimplyLife (which was under Maxim's operation). The police then stormed the mall and beat the protesters with police batons and pepper-sprayed them. The police also indiscriminately pushed and beat people who were retreating down an elevator, and shot pepper balls at people who have verbally insulted them. Journalists and shoppers were then forced to leave the mall.

The police and protesters also clashed with each other in Tsuen Wan, as the Tsuen Wan riot police officers faced allegations that they have gang raped a young girl. During the confrontation between the police and the protester, the police shot a tear gas canister at the arm of a reporter from Now TV. The protesters then retreated to Citywalk in Tsuen Wan. Scuffles between the police and the protesters also occurred in Tuen Mun, Mong Kok, Tai Po, and Tseung Kwan O, near the car park where Chow fell. The Northern District saw the first usage of tear gas by the police after residents disgruntled by the police's search on teenagers who were playing basketball attempted to argue with officers near Ching Ho Estate, Sheung Shui. Riot police climbed over a 3-meter gate of Kingswood Villas, Tin Shui Wai, and conducted arrests inside. Disgruntled residents later then confronted with the police.

=== 11–15 November city-wide strike ===
Protesters disrupted the morning commute on 11 November as part of a plan for a city-wide strike, calling for students, business owners and employees to skip work and boycott classes, as a response to HKUST student Alex Chow's mysterious fall to his death in a multi-storey car park. The protesters continued the strike over the following five days.

Carrie Lam labelled the protesters as the enemy of the people and criticised the violence used by the protesters, which she said had "exceeded" their demands for democracy. On the next day, she praised the citizens who insisted on going to work or to school despite the protests. Chinese leader Xi Jinping, speaking at a Brazil summit, voiced his support for the police, and added that "persistent radical and violent crimes" had undermined the rule of law in Hong Kong.

Taiwanese president Tsai Ing-wen criticised the Hong Kong government on Facebook, stating they should not shoot unarmed people, while the mainland and Hong Kong governments should honor the commitment to democracy and freedom, in reference to the Hong Kong Basic Law. She later called on the international community to stand with Hong Kong after the police confronted the protesters at CUHK. The United States expressed "grave concerns" for the situation in Hong Kong and urged both sides to "exercise restraints". It urged the Beijing government to honour the Sino-British Joint Declaration and the Hong Kong government and the protesters to engage in dialogue to resolve the conflict. UK Prime Minister Boris Johnson released a statement urging both sides to exercise restraint and stating that the UK government was deeply disturbed by the events. Like the US, he urged both camps to engage in dialogue.

==== 11 November ====
Protesters began to gather at 6:30 am and then began disrupting both MTR operations and surface transports starting from 7 am. Objects were thrown onto the train tracks of the East Rail line, and later, molotov bottles were thrown onto a Central-bound train in Kwai Fong station. Tung Chung station was the first stations closed by the MTR Corporation, citing an "escalation" of events. MTR then shut down Whampoa station at 8:18 am, and Kwai Fong station at 8:53 am. Kwun Tong line, Tung Chung line, East Rail line, Ma On Shan line and Light Rail services were all disrupted.

Protesters also made makeshift roadblocks in major thoroughfares in Kowloon and New Territories, including in districts such as Sha Tin, near the Chinese University of Hong Kong, Yuen Long, Hung Hom and Tsuen Wan. In Kwai Fong, protesters set up a roadblock near the Metroplaza mall. A police officer riding a motorcycle charged into a crowd of demonstrators and zig-zagged across the road in an attempt to hit the protesters. The officer appeared not to hit any protesters straight on, but came very close to slamming straight into one. The police motorcycle was accused of deliberately ramming into the protesters, while the police claimed that he was trying to "separate" the protesters and the police and that the officer in question has been forced to take a sabbatical from work. The video quickly went viral in the Internet, and pro-democracy activist Joshua Wong responded to the incident and stated that the police officer had gone 'berserk' and his behaviour was 'disturbing'.

External videos
- Incident in which a man was set on fire by a protester
- Incident in which a pregnant woman is arrested

Later that day in Ma On Shan, a protester poured flammable liquid onto a man and lit him on fire during an argument between the man and the protesters. The incident happened as the 57-year-old man confronted the group of protesters who were vandalising Ma On Shan station. The man was afterwards transported to the Prince of Wales Hospital at Sha Tin in critical condition, with head trauma and severe burns. A spokeswoman for the Fire Services Department said that the victim had second-degree burns on 28 per cent of his body. The police classified the incident as an attempted murder case. In response to the incident, the Chief Executive Carrie Lam said that the fire attack was an inhumane act.

Amidst online calls to facilitate a general strike, protesters near Hong Kong Polytechnic University constructed makeshift roadblocks and barricades with various furniture outside the school campus. The riot police then entered the university and shot tear gas canisters inside the school campus. Student protesters, in return, set up barricades and threw petrol bombs. Similar incidents also happened in University of Hong Kong and Chinese University of Hong Kong where the police shot tear gas into the campuses and student protesters confronted with the police for several hours. The major universities in Hong Kong and institutions organised by the Vocational Training Council suspended their classes on that day.

The police shot numerous canisters of tear gas to disperse the protesters in regions including Choi Hung and Tseung Kwan O, where a tear gas canister landed next to a secondary school. In response to the shooting, office workers in Central, Hong Kong's central business district, marched on Pedder Street and briefly occupied Des Voeux Road Central and shouted out slogans, condemning the police as "murderers" during the lunchtime in a "Lunch with You" march. Riot police were deployed at 12:30 pm to warn the crowd that they would use force to disperse the protesters. At 12:47 pm. the police shot fire tear gas to disperse the crowd. A man's head was hit by a tear gas canister. The Hang Seng Index dropped 2.6% after tear gas was fired in Central. The police reported that protesters have set up roadblocks in more than 120 locations in Hong Kong, and have arrested 266 people, whose age ranges from 11 to 74 years old. At least 60 people were injured. 255 canisters of tear gas, 204 shots of rubber bullets, 45 shots of beanbag rounds and 96 shots of sponge grenades were used by the police.

===== Shooting incident =====
External videos
- Incident in which a protester was shot by police (HKFP)

Before 7:30 am on Monday 11 November 2019, a group of protesters had gathered in Sai Wan Ho at the intersection of Shau Kei Wan Road and Tai On Street, near Tai On Building. While they were trying to block the road, policemen arrived and tried to disperse the crowd. A lone traffic policeman rushed forward and raised his gun at a young man in a white hoodie and mask who approached him. The man in the white hoodie raised his hands to the policeman to show that he did not have any weapons. The traffic police officer drew his revolver and pointed it at the man in the white hoodie, pressing the barrel into his chest. The policeman then grabbed him in a chokehold and the two began to grapple and struggle. As they struggled while the policeman was still holding his gun, an unarmed man in black approached in the direction where the two were entangled. The 21-year-old man in black was shot once in the abdomen after approaching the policeman and making a swiping motion toward his gun. He fell on the zebra crossing between MTR Exit B and Tai On Building. A third young man, dressed in black, approached and was also shot at twice but not hit. In total, the traffic policeman fired three live rounds.

The man in white escaped right after the shots were fired. Another policeman arrived at the scene and controlled the first man who was shot. The police officer who opened fire continued to point his gun around, while another police officer used his baton to warn the bystanders and protesters. After that, some riot police arrived and sprayed pepper spray at rioters. They also arrested two people. After the man was shot and lost consciousness, a police officer pulled him up to sit, in an attempt to handcuff him and shook his body, exacerbating the bleeding from his abdomen and dangerously reducing blood supply to his brain. Police defended the officer who had moved the unconscious injured man, stating that the officer had been "unaware of the injury" and that security concerns had played a role.

The men were sent to the hospital. At 9:15 am, the Hong Kong Hospital Authority revealed that one of the men was undergoing surgery in Pamela Youde Nethersole Eastern Hospital. The man shot in the abdomen suffered damage to the right kidney and right-side liver with injury to the portal vein. The man remained in critical condition after surgery which removed a bullet, his right kidney, and part of the liver.

The Hong Kong Institute of Vocational Education (IVE) issued a declaration confirming the man as a student of their Chai Wan campus. In a statement, the Vocational Training Council, the IVE's parent organization, said they were distressed and sad over the man's injury and had written to the Security Bureau asking for a complete investigation of the incident. Salesian English School, the injured protester's alma mater, issued a statement condemning the police's use of excessive violence and fatal weapons, arguing that they chased citizens away indiscriminately and were indifferent to life. They expressed serious concern and urged the government to set up an independent commission of inquiry. They also highlighted their distress and urged youngsters to express their demands peacefully, protecting themselves and others. In its press conference, the police confirmed that a traffic officer fired three live rounds; they claimed that one of the officers attempted to fire warning shots in response to protesters trying to grab the officer's gun, with one shot hitting one of the protesters at the scene.

Amnesty International condemned the police's operations on 11 November. It called for the police officer who shot the teens at a point blank range to be suspended from duty immediately and called the officer who rammed into the crowd of protesters "out of control with a mindset of retaliation".

By the evening of 11 November 2019, the shooting incident had caused an outcry at Good Hope School, the school of the traffic officer's two daughters. He resigned from the PTA the same day. He was doxed and received death threats against his daughters soon after the shooting.

==== 12 November ====
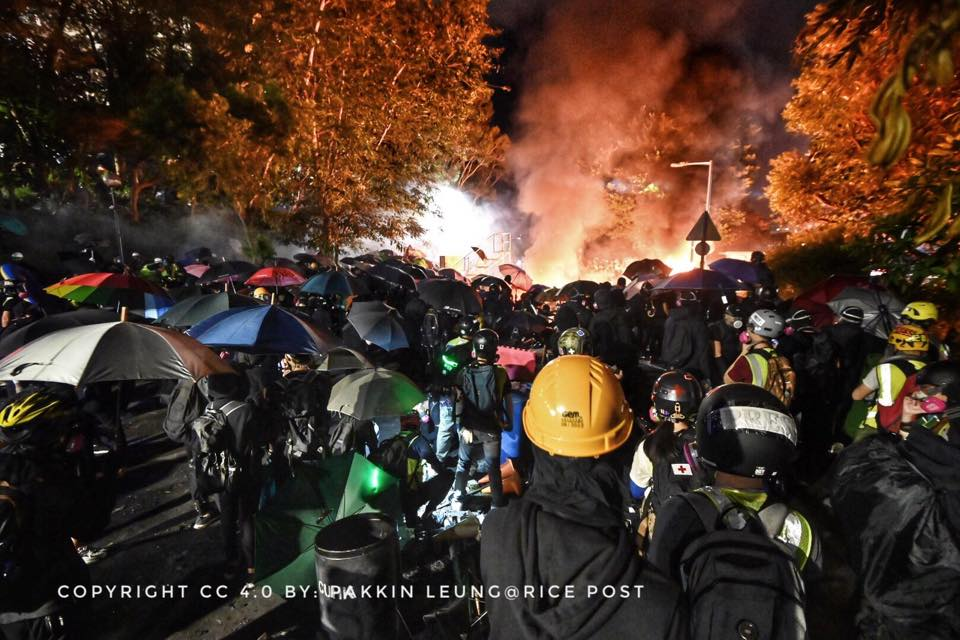
Protesters at CUHK

In Central, a few thousand people, including office workers and protesters dressed in black, occupied streets at midday; tear gas was fired in the afternoon to clear out the remaining crowd. Some universities and schools closed, but the government ruled out an official suspension of classes to avoid being seen as submitting to protesters. The police also confronted with the protesters outside City University of Hong Kong, who threw objects from the footbridge in an attempt to block the traffic in Kowloon Tong. The police and the protesters also clashed briefly at the University of Hong Kong. In HKU, protesters blocked the entrance of the HKU station. Several professors, including the Dean of the Science Faculty, attempted to persuade the students to stop the blockade, though most black-clad protesters ignored them.

For the entire day, the police clashed with the protesters in Chinese University of Hong Kong. At night, protesters marched into the Festival Walk mall in Kowloon Tong after the mall closed early and set a giant Christmas tree on fire; some glass guard rails and doors were also smashed. A China Mobile shop was set on fire in Causeway Bay. In Sheung Shui, a train was firebombed and objects were thrown onto the train track. In Mong Kok, police fired multiple tear gas rounds as protesters blocked roads and vandalised public infrastructure, such as traffic lights and switch boxes. In Tin Shui Wai, protesters besieged and started a fire inside the police station. In Sha Tin, a police van was set on fire. Government published figures indicated that the police fired a record 2,330 canisters of tear gas that day all over Hong Kong, in particular at the Chinese University – the highest number in a single day since the protests began in June.

On 5 October 2023, jail sentences of up to four years for rioting were handed out to ten people who had protested in Central. They had damaged buses, thrown petrol bombs and bricks at police, and vandalized restaurants perceived to be opposing the protests, the judge said. On 2 March 2024, eight protesters were sentenced for rioting and breaching anti-mask laws, and jailed for up to three years and nine months.

==== 13 November ====
Protesters obstructed train services at multiple stations. At one point in the morning, the MTR suspended services on the Tsuen Wan, East Rail and Kwun Tong lines entirely, though partial service on the Kwun Tong line resumed later. A section of the West Rail line was also closed, along with a few other individual stations in the MTR network and parts of the Light Rail. The Tolo Highway, which connects parts of the New Territories to Kowloon and Hong Kong Island, was shut down. The Transport Department reported that many bus routes were out of operation due to road conditions, with only 108 routes still running by 11 am. Oxfam announced it was cancelling its annual Trailwalker charity event, due to take place the coming weekend, due to an inability to guarantee the safety of participants.

The Educational Bureau announced that all schools would be suspended on 14 November, after criticism following Carrie Lam's statement the previous day which suggested that suspending classes would cause the government to fall into the "protesters' trap". More than 100 schools already suspended classes individually that day, while at least ten higher educational institutions suspended classes for the rest of the week. The Bureau was criticised for the delay in class suspension, with school management staff calling for an extension of the school closure until the end of the week. Both the Hong Kong Association of the Heads of Secondary Schools and the Hong Kong Professional Teachers' Union noted the Bureau's failure to protect the safety of students in their late decision to suspend classes.

Lunchtime protests occurred in Central again. Protesters blocked the junction of Des Voeux Road Central and Pedder Street with bricks and bamboo poles; riot police responded by firing tear gas. A person with his head bleeding was tied up and flipped over by riot police; he remained conscious, while nearby protesters chanted for his release. At night, protesters set the toll gates of the Cross-Harbour Tunnel on fire. Protesters clashed with the police in Sha Tin, and one tear gas canister was shot into a fifth-floor apartment in Chuk Lam Court. Flower troughs outside the Shatin Law Courts Building was also set on fire; the next day, both the Hong Kong Bar Association and the Law Society of Hong Kong condemned the arson as an attack on the city's rule of law. A man died after allegedly falling from a tall building in Tsuen Wan. A 15-year-old boy, who was suspected to be stricken by a tear gas canister in Tin Shui Wai, remained in a critical condition after undergoing four hours of brain surgery at Tuen Mun Hospital overnight.

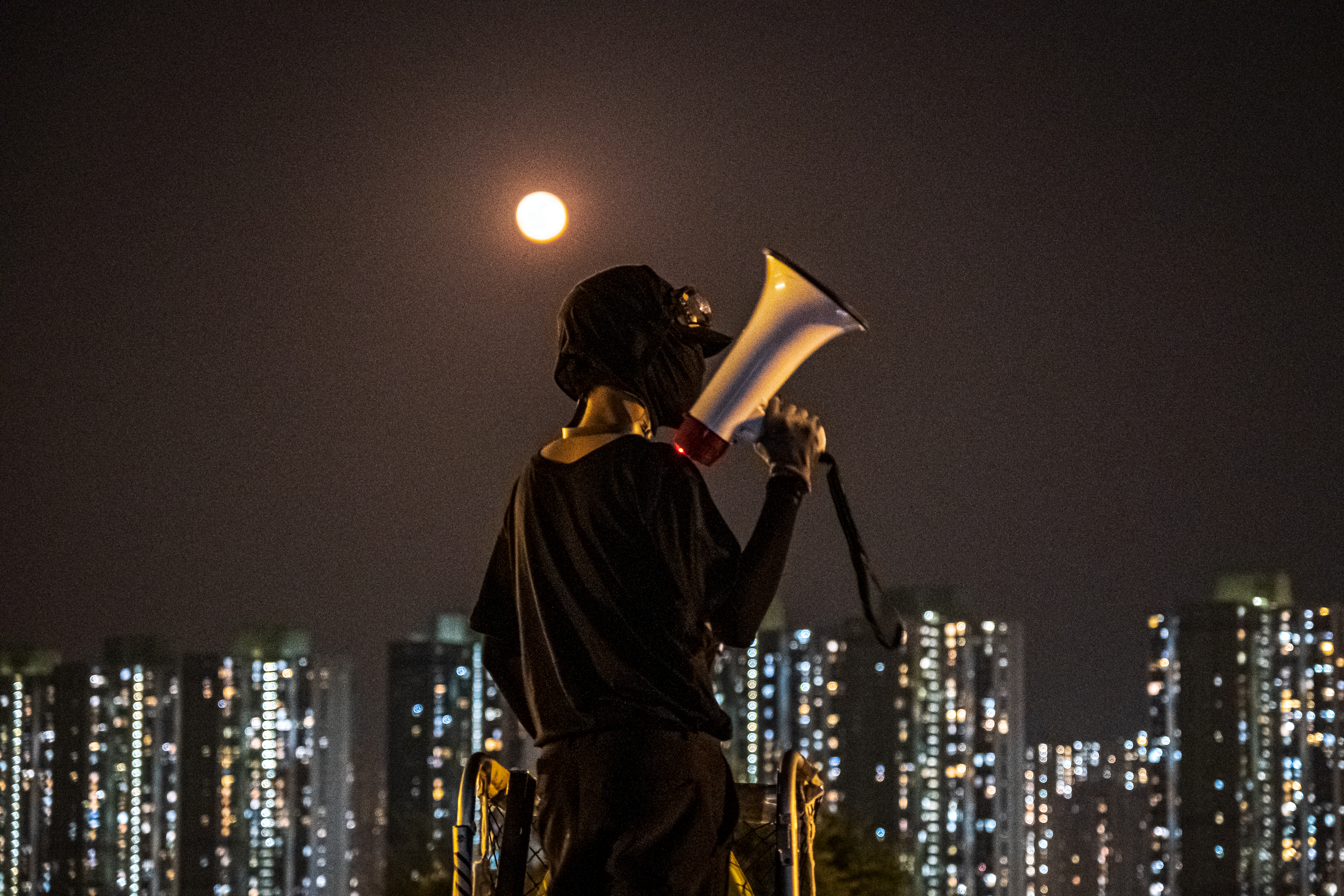
Protester on a ladder holding a megaphone

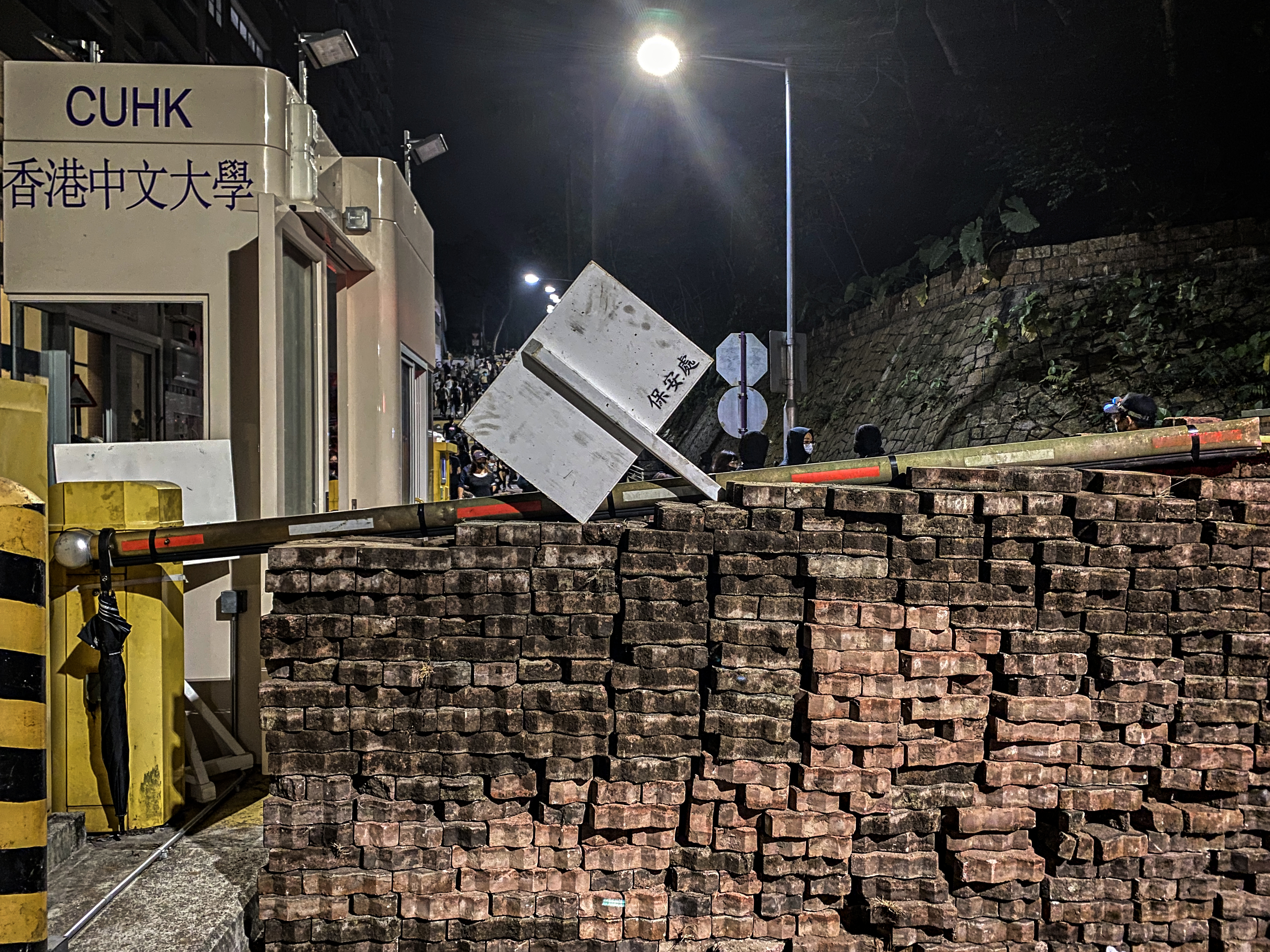
A makeshift wall put up at the entrance of CUHK

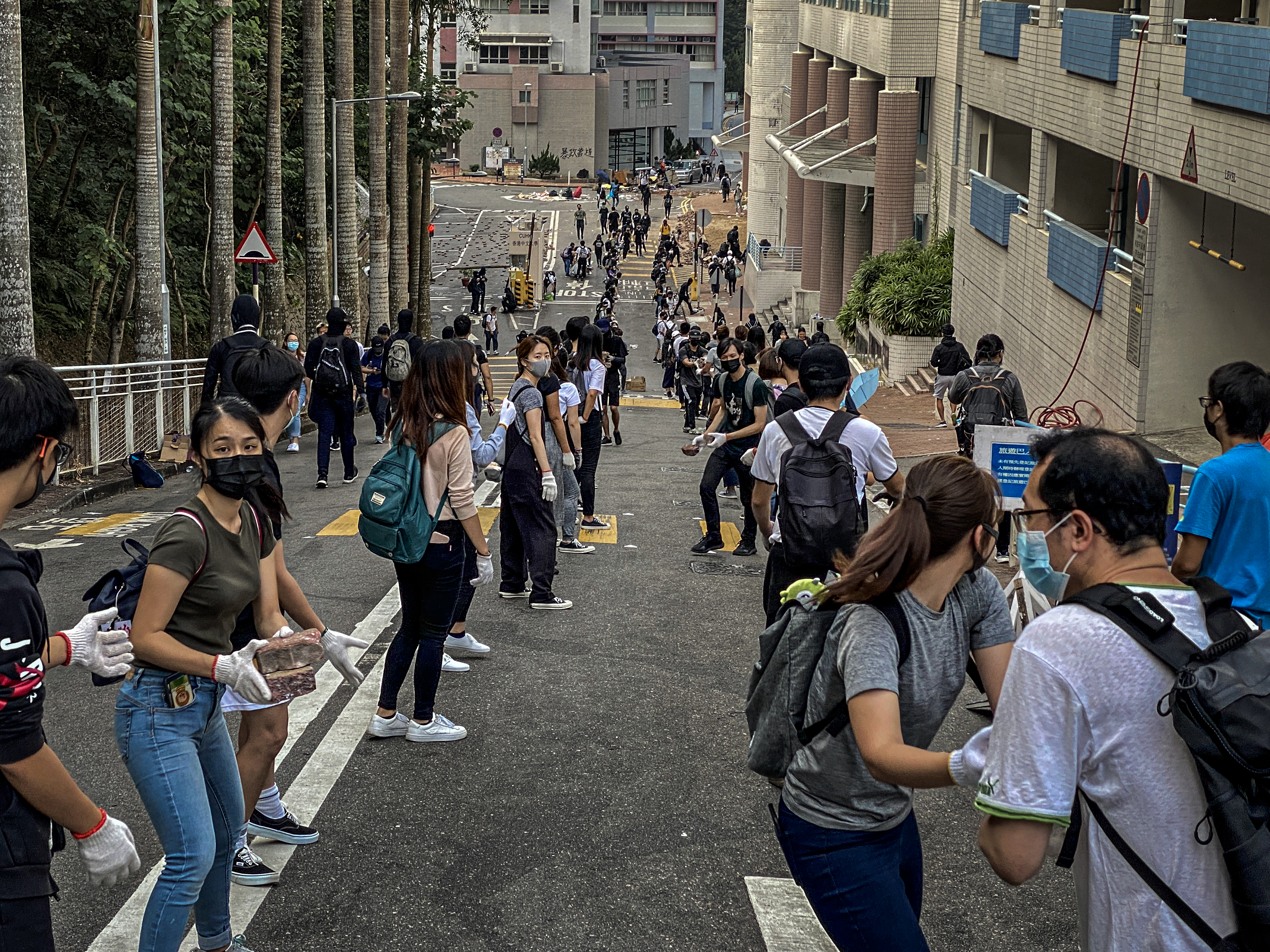
Protesters moving bricks

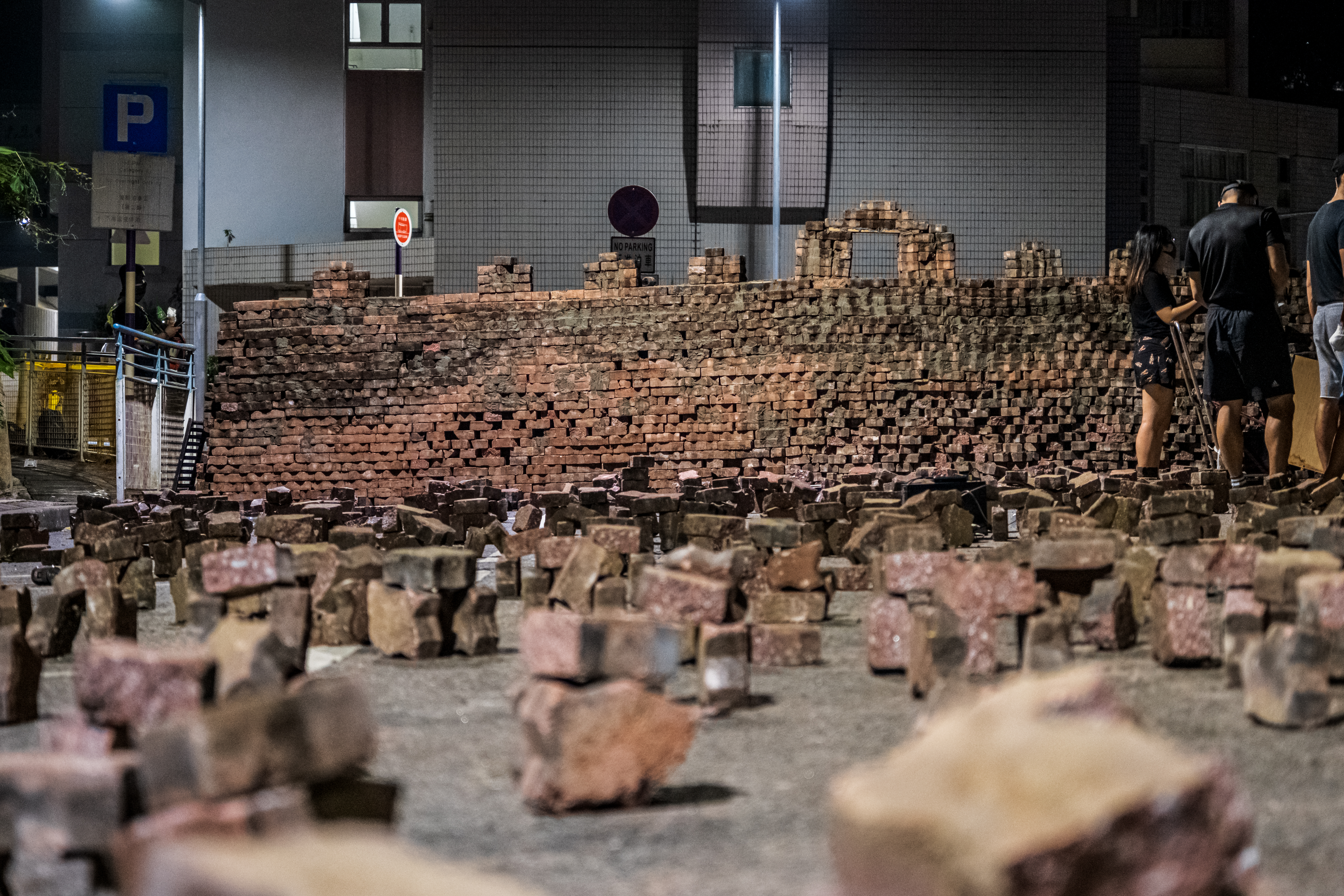
Another makeshift wall put up

===== Death of Luo Changqing =====
External videos
- The 13 November Sheung Shui clash, including the fatal throw (SCMP)

In Sheung Shui, a violent clash erupted between anti-government protesters and pro-government residents, which saw both groups hurling bricks at each other. The confrontation between the two groups occurred when the latter group tried to clear bricks from the street and were confronted by over 20 black-clad protesters who began throwing objects at the group. A 70-year-old man, Luo Changqing, who was using his mobile phone to record the conflict in the area of the fighting, was hit in the head by a brick thrown by a protester. The victim fell to the ground immediately and remained in an unconscious state. He was first transported to the North District Hospital and then to the Prince of Wales Hospital in a critical and life-threatening condition, before dying there at 10:51 pm on the following day. The man was identified as an outsourced worker of the Food and Environmental Hygiene Department. At a regular briefing, the police stated that they have identified several suspects and that investigations were ongoing. They classified his death as a murder, believing the attacker to have "maliciously [and] deliberately" carried out the act. The Prince of Wales hospital said it would transfer the case to the Coroner's Court for investigation, while the Food and Environmental Hygiene Department expressed "profound sadness" over the death. On 14 December, the Hong Kong Police released a statement stating they had arrested three males and two females aged 15 to 18 the previous day on suspicion of his murder, as well as rioting and wounding.

==== 14 November – Twilight action ====
The fourth day of the city-wide strike was named Twilight Action (Chinese: 曙光行動). Early in the morning, police fired tear gas into the Hong Kong Polytechnic University (PolyU) campus in Hung Hom. One arrow was suspected to be shot from the university towards a group of police officers patrolling nearby, though no police officer was injured. In a press conference, police condemned the action, saying that the shot could have been lethal. The Education Bureau announced that schools would suspend classes from Friday to Sunday. At lunchtime, hundreds of people protested on the streets in Central like the previous three days, while a few hundred also rallied on the streets in Taikoo Place in eastern Hong Kong Island.

At noon in Sheung Shui, a group of around twenty middle-aged men used steel tubes to attack two young women who were setting up road blocks. The two women were unable to escape and were grabbed at the same time by a large man wearing a white shirt and jeans. One of the women was able to escape but the other was grabbed and dragged away quickly; she only escaped by taking off her jacket and backpack. She said she was not going to report the incident to police for fear of retribution from police, being concerned that she may instead be treated as a perpetrator. The group of men also attacked other young people dressed in black at the same time. In an interview, the two women expressed their frustration at people fleeing the scene instead of going back to help them escape.

At night, around a thousand people gathered at Edinburgh Place to express support towards firefighters and paramedics in Hong Kong for their work during the protests. Participants contrasted their work with that of the police, praising firefighter and ambulance teams for treating people equally and helped injured people regardless of their political views. The rally was authorised by police and no incidents occurred.

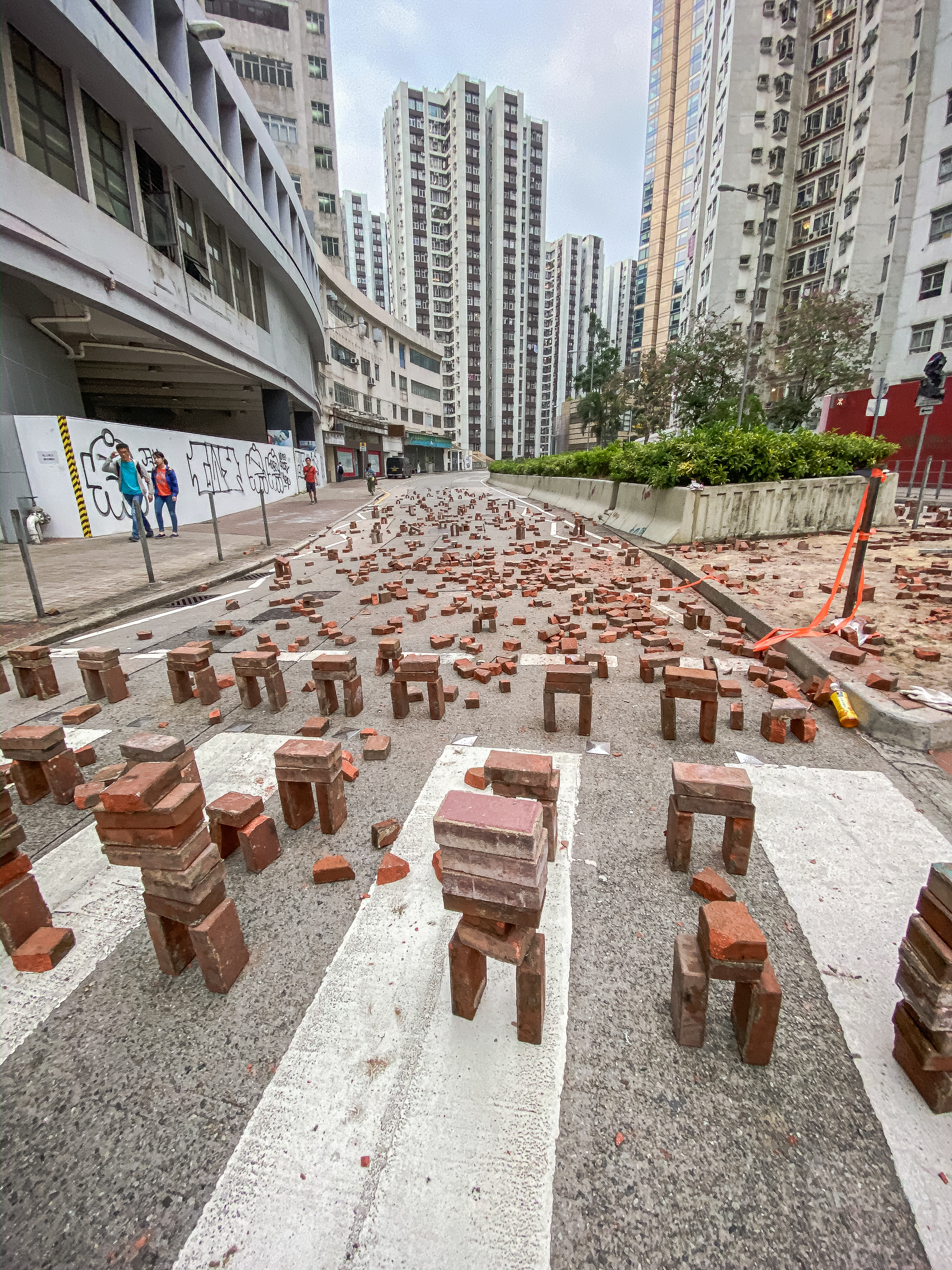
Protester-placed bricks on a road

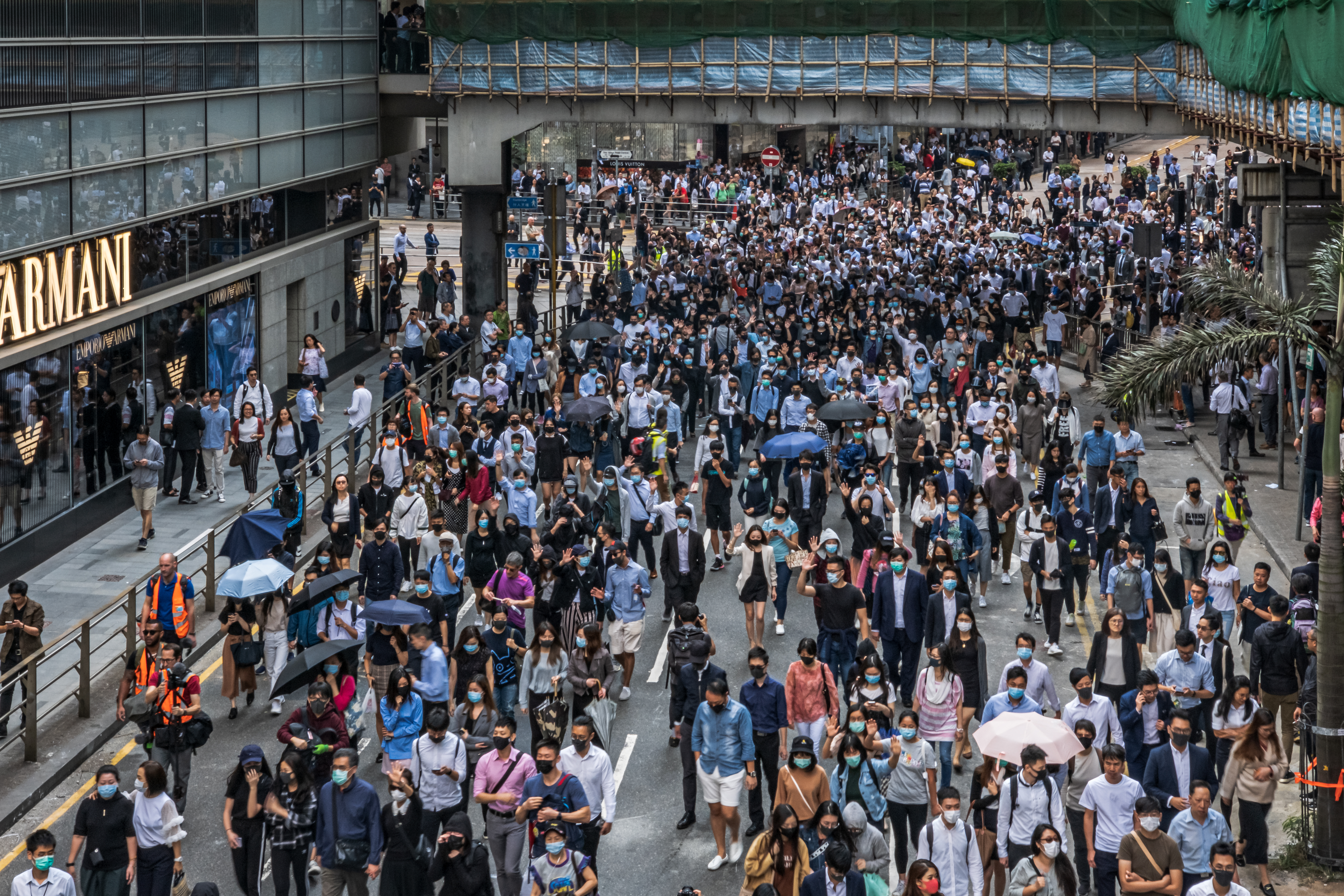
Protesters in the street

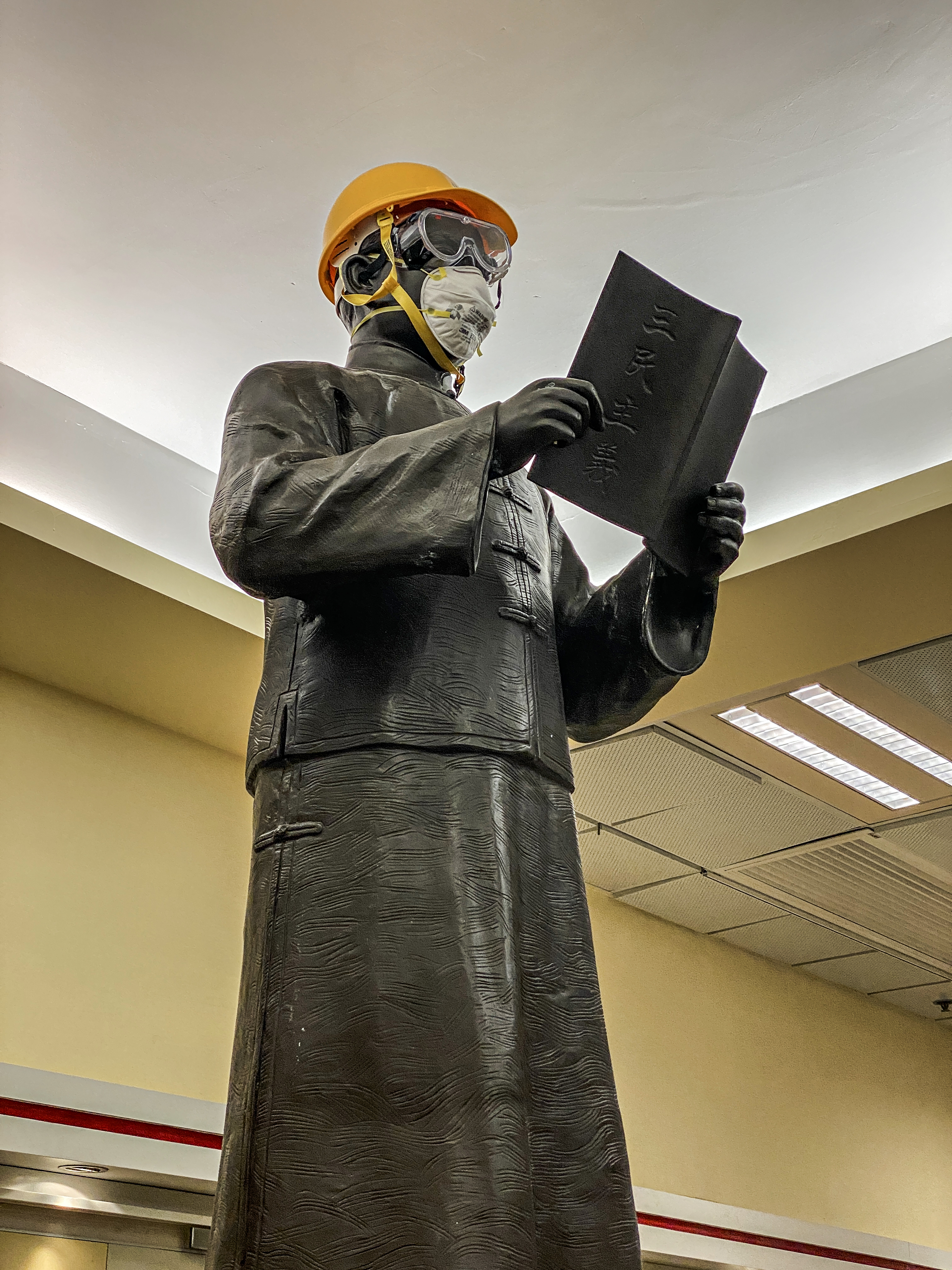
Protester-placed equipment on statue

==== 15 November – Sunrise Action ====
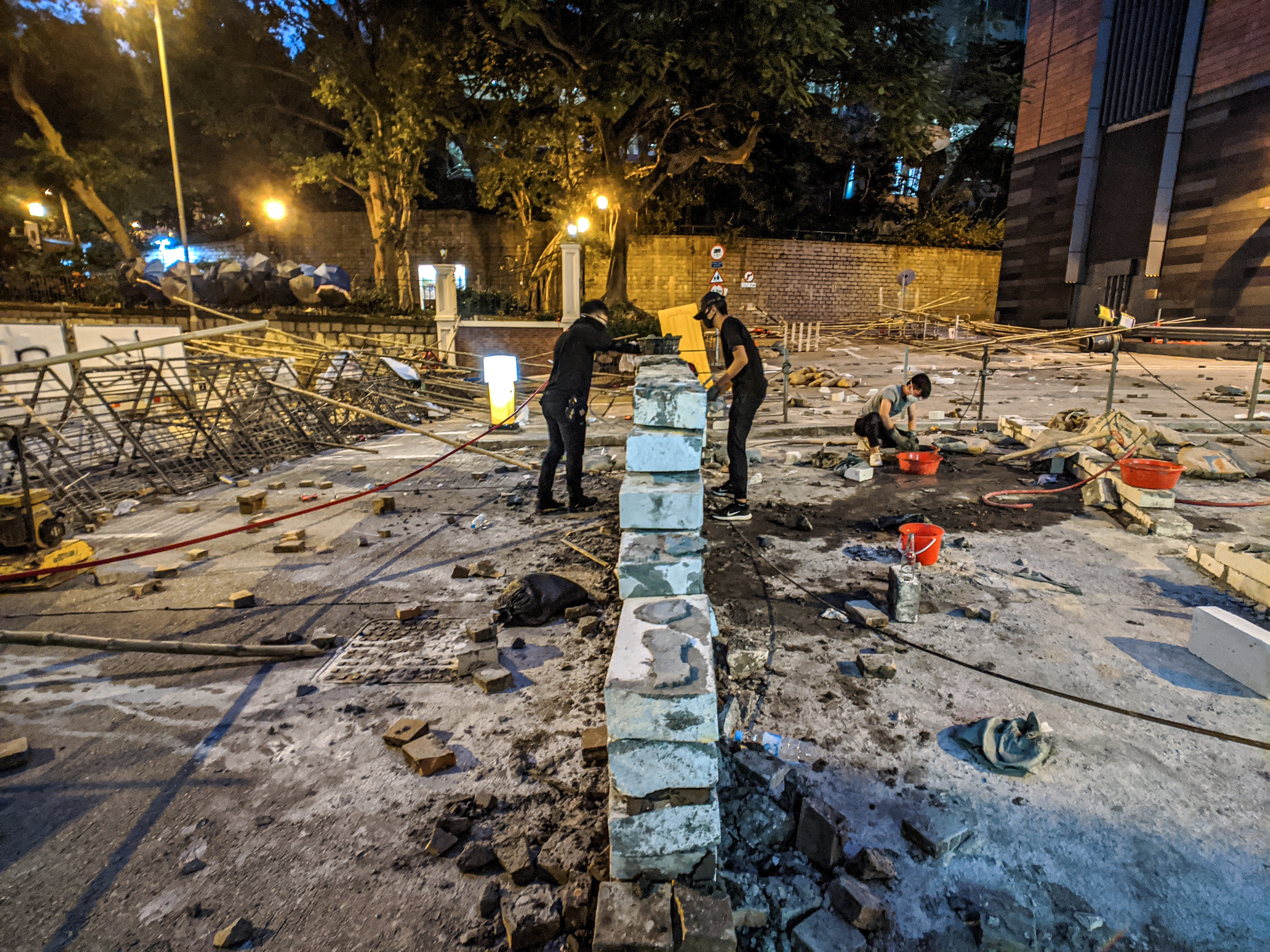
Protesters building a wall in a road

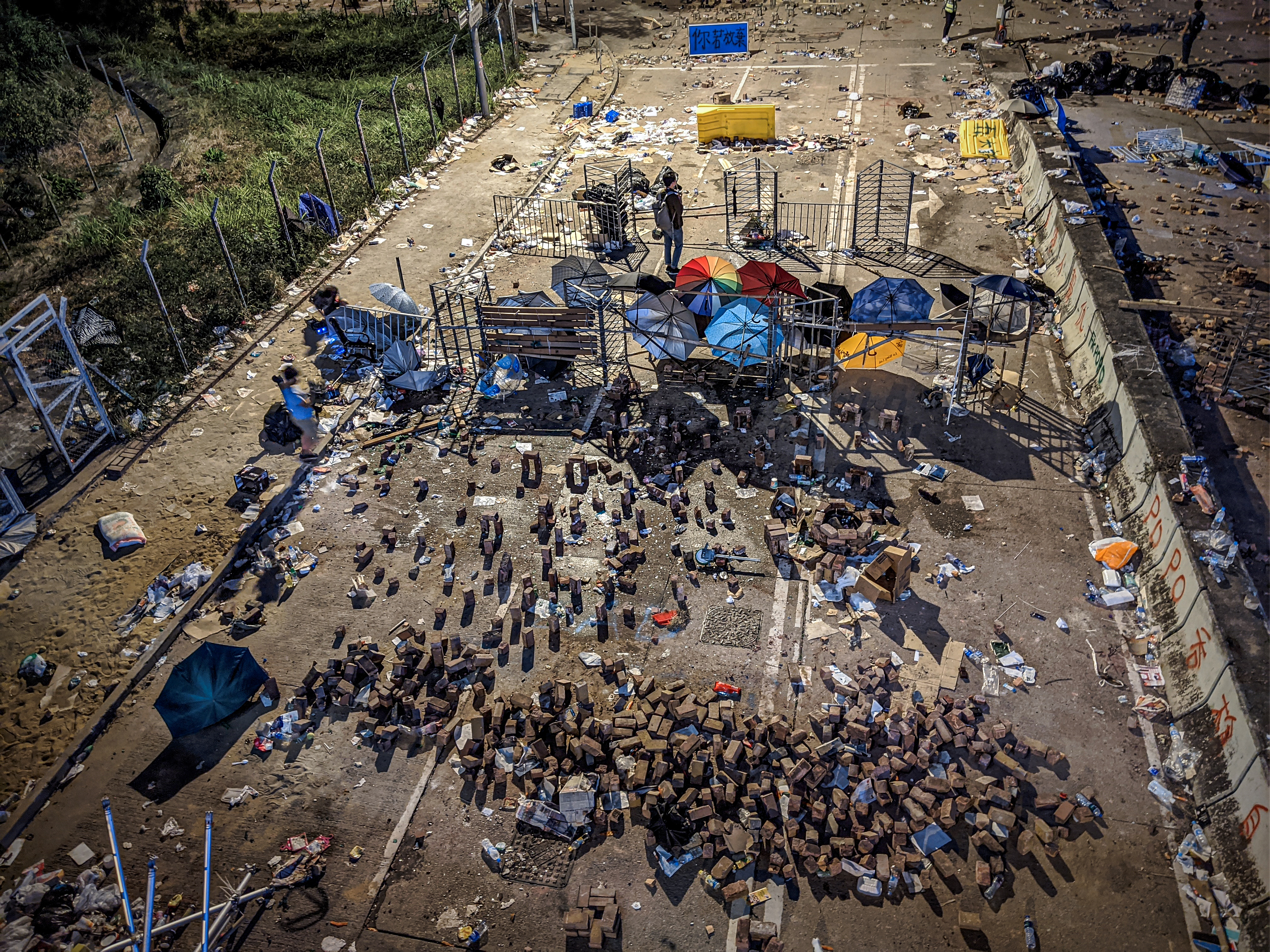
A road at the end of the day

The fifth day of the city-wide strike was named Sunrise Action (Chinese: 旭日行動). Thousands of people, mainly office workers, protested on the streets in Central, chanting the slogan "Stand with Hong Kong" and raising an open hand, with the five fingers referencing the "five demands" associated with the protests. The CBD protests spread to more areas including Tai Koo Shing and Wong Chuk Hang. Two German exchange students at Lingnan University were arrested for unlawful assembly. At night, a car was set on fire at CUHK. Magnetic Asia, the organisers of Clockenflap, an annual music and arts festival in Hong Kong, announced the cancellation of the 2019 event, originally set to take place the following week. Hundreds of runners proceeded with the original 100 km (62 mi) Oxfam Trailwalker course despite its official cancellation.

=== 16 November ===
External videos
- The first public appearance of the People's Liberation Army on the streets (SCMP)

All lanes of the Tolo Highway reopened to traffic, and the MTR's East Rail line returned to normal service, though the university and Sheung Shui stations remained closed.

Thousands of people participated in the annual Hong Kong Pride Parade. The event was held at Edinburgh Place in Central in the form of a rally instead of a march like previous years, due to the police rejecting the organiser's application for a march due to safety concerns. Organisers estimated a turnout of 6,500 people, halved from previous years, while police estimated 850.

The People's Liberation Army (PLA) soldiers have appeared publicly for the first time in the streets, in plain clothes and unarmed, to help clear roadblocks and other debris left during protests alongside local residents, firefighters, and police officers before marching back to the Kowloon East barracks around 5 pm. That night, the government confirmed that it had not requested any assistance from the PLA. The move was slammed by both the pro-democracy camp and by protesters. In a joint statement, 24 pro-democracy lawmakers condemned the PLA garrison for allegedly breaching the Hong Kong Basic Law and the Garrison Law, which state that the garrison "shall not interfere in local affairs" and must notify the Hong Kong government before conducting activities involving public interests. Civic Party lawmaker Dennis Kwok said he filed an urgent question at LegCo. The Citizens' Press Conference, a platform for protesters, described the incident as illustrating the "boiling frog syndrome" and setting a precedent to "violently suppress" Hongkongers in the future.

=== 17 November ===
External videos
- Night clashes around Hong Kong Polytechnic University (SCMP)

Clashes occurred at the Polytechnic University. Protesters set fire to debris on a footbridge connecting the university campus to MTR Hung Hom station, and used catapults to launch objects at police. Police used a Long Range Acoustic Device to "issue warnings" at protesters, and deployed two water cannon trucks; the top of one of the trucks was set alight by protesters who threw petrol bombs at them. One police officer was hit in the leg with an arrow, piercing through his calf. At midnight, police warned that live rounds may be used at protesters because police officers were targeted.

Police locked down the PolyU campus at night by surrounding the main entrances to the university, and thoroughly searched everyone, including journalists, who wanted to leave. The police force issued a warning that anyone remaining on campus may be treated as taking part in a riot, ordering people to leave from an exit by the university's Lee Shau Kee Building. Protesters called upon supporters to "rescue" those who remained at PolyU and were unable to leave; cars headed to the area early Monday morning.

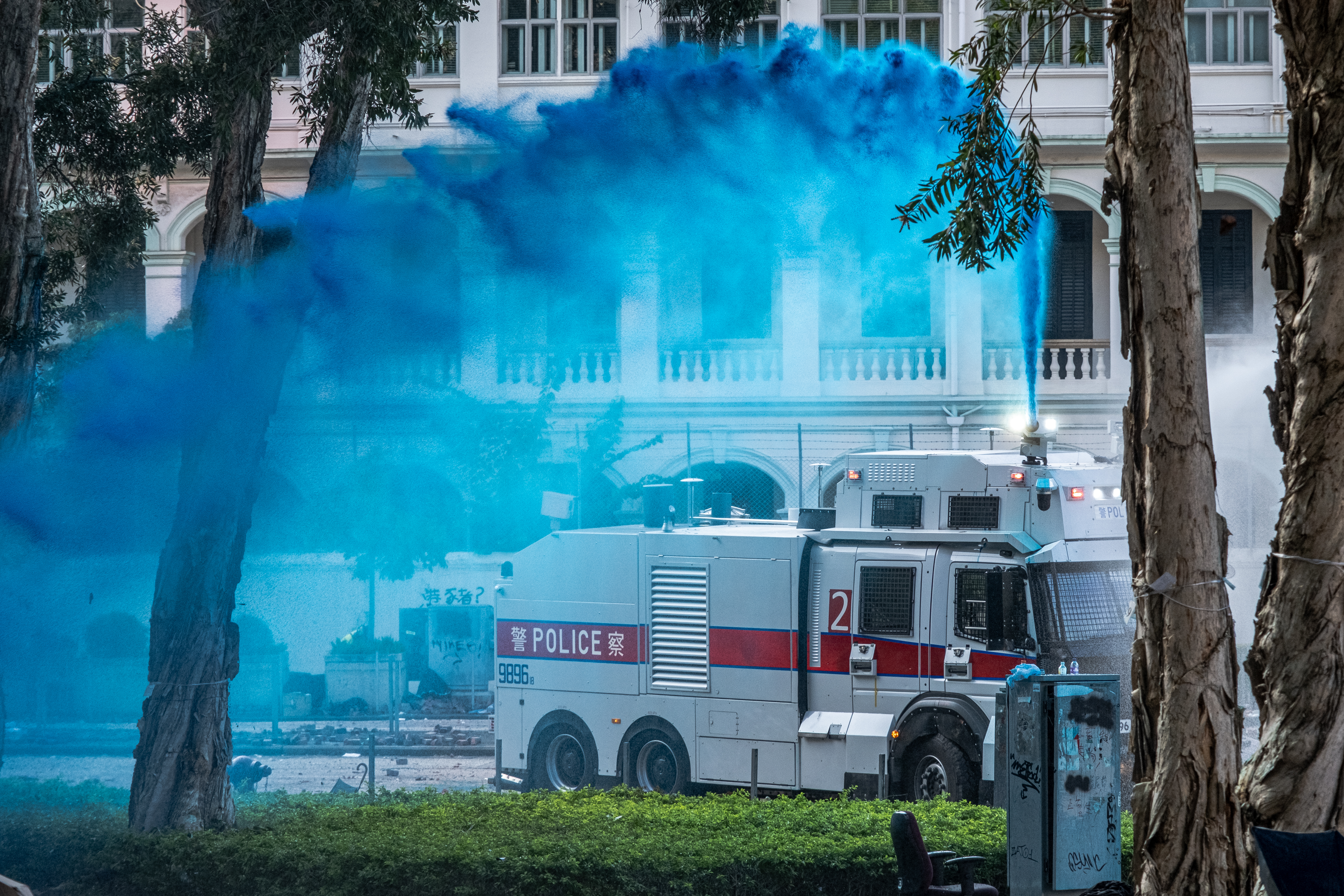
Police used a blue dye water gun

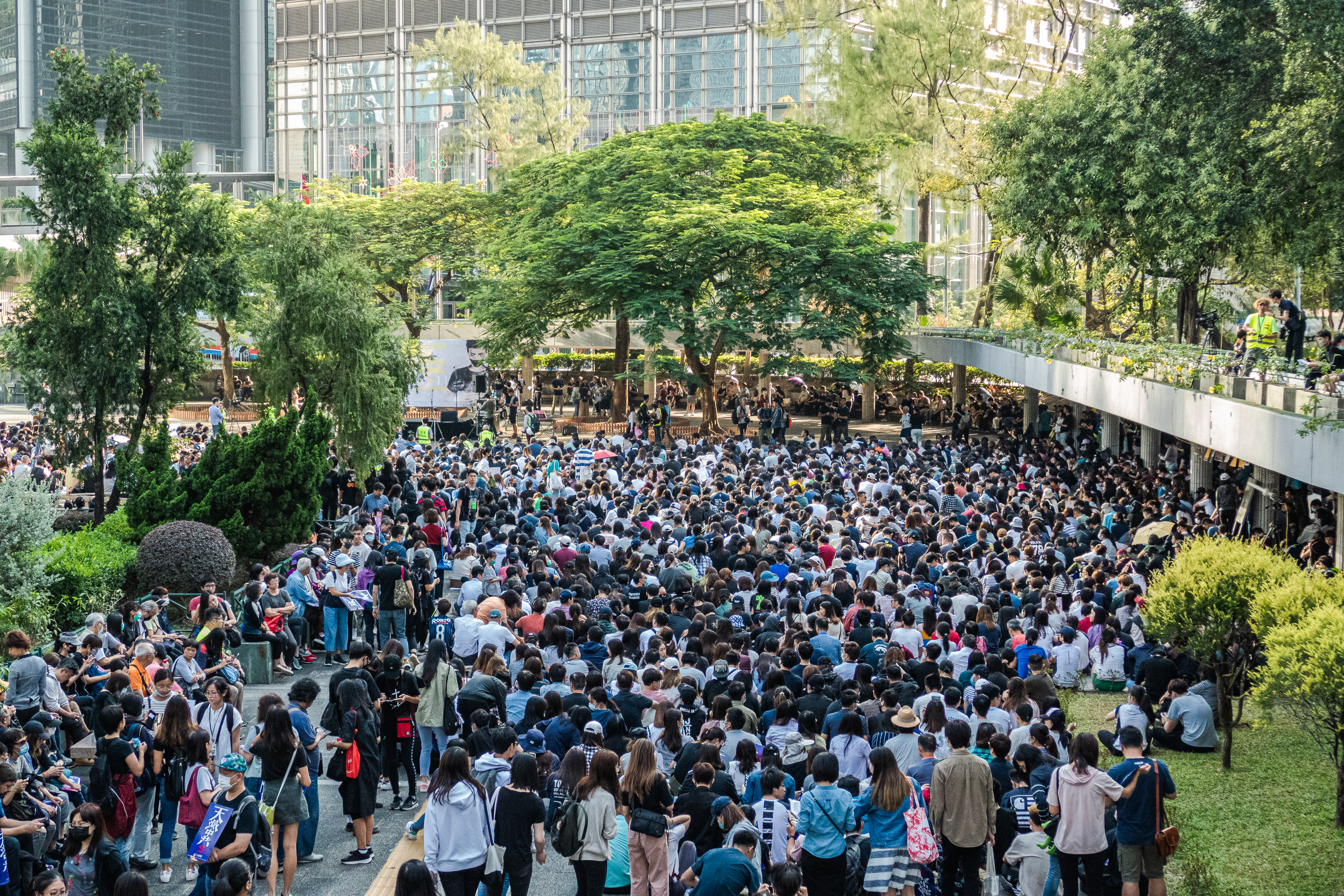
Protesters in the streets

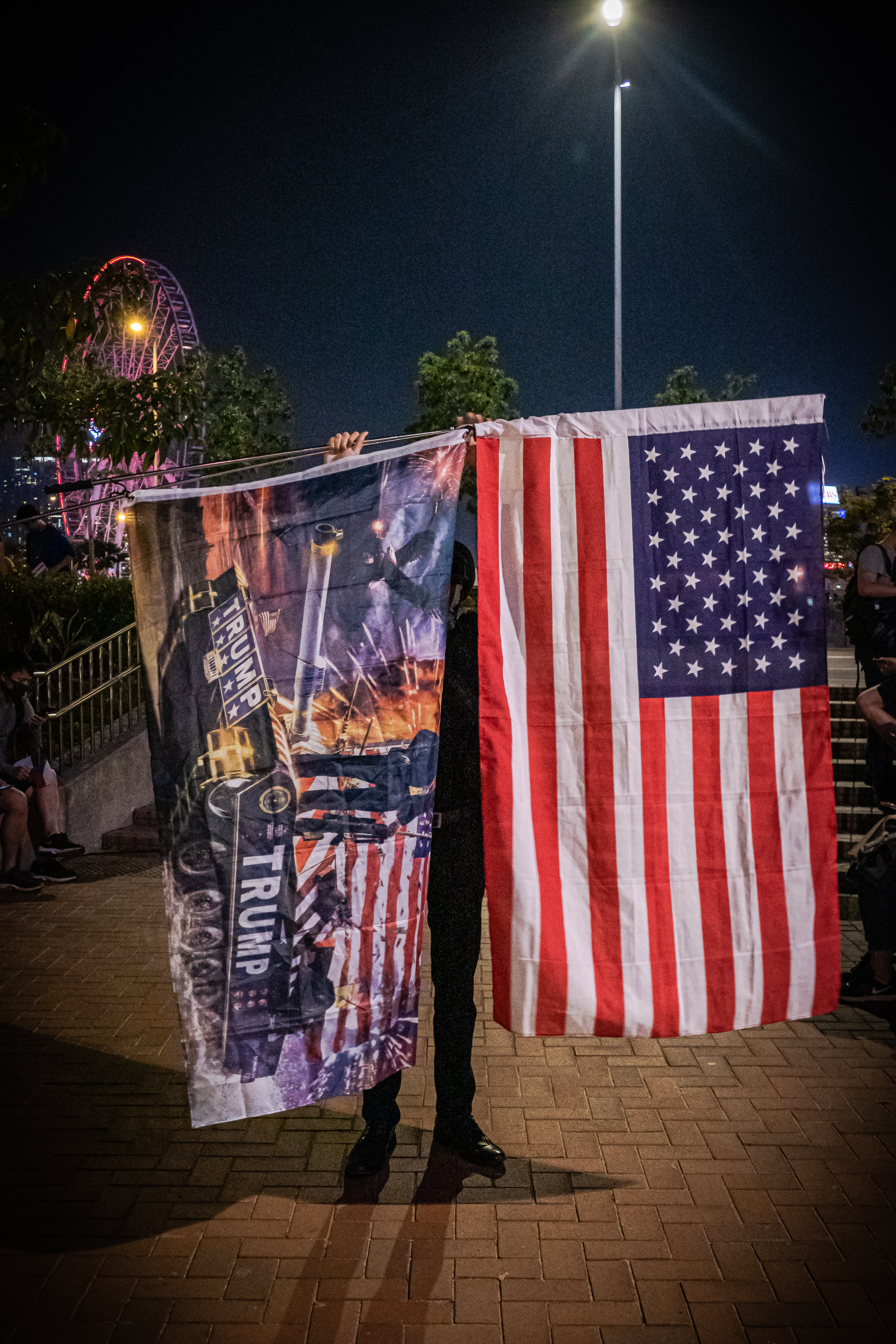
A protester waving the American flag

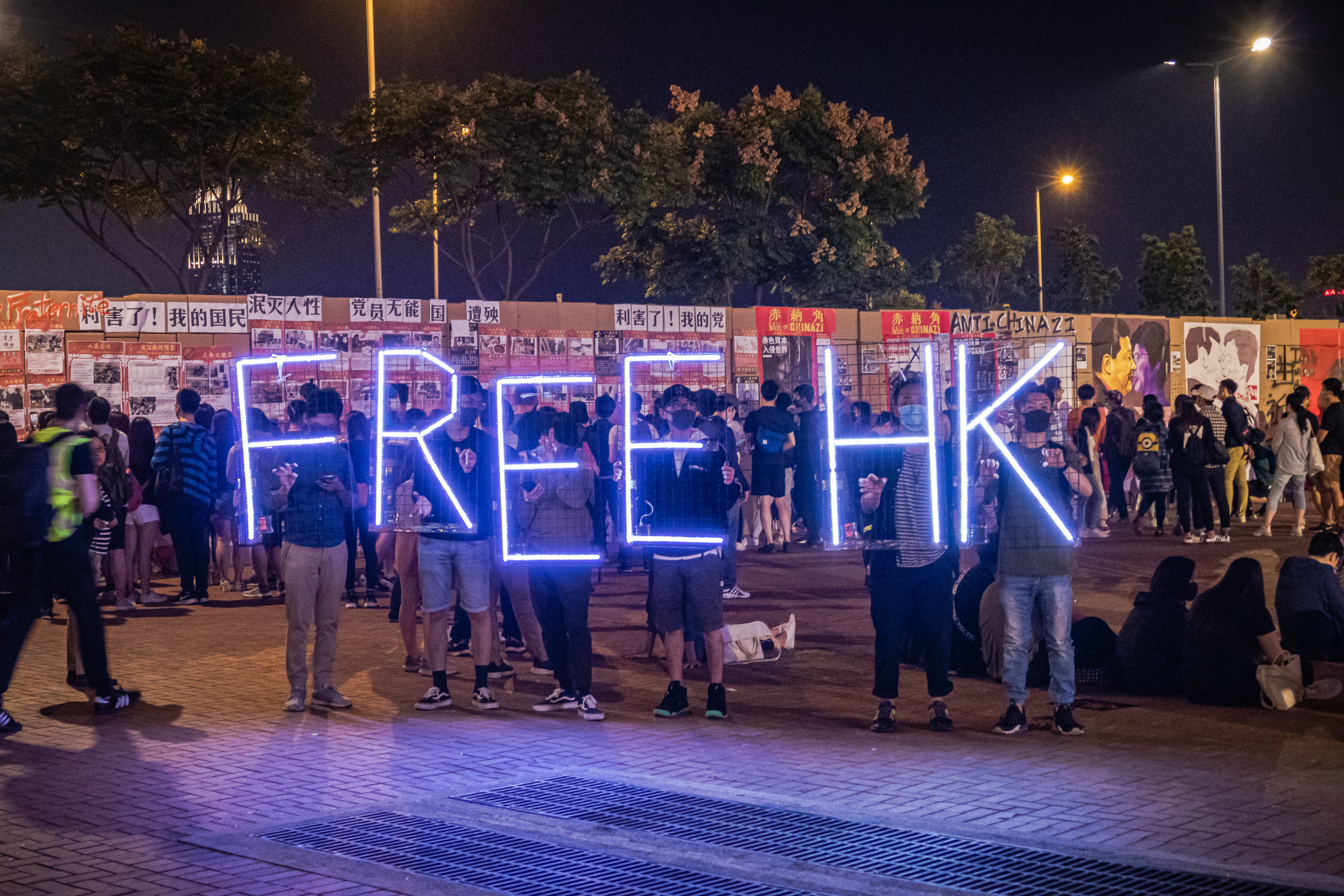
Protesters holding a 'FREE HK' sign

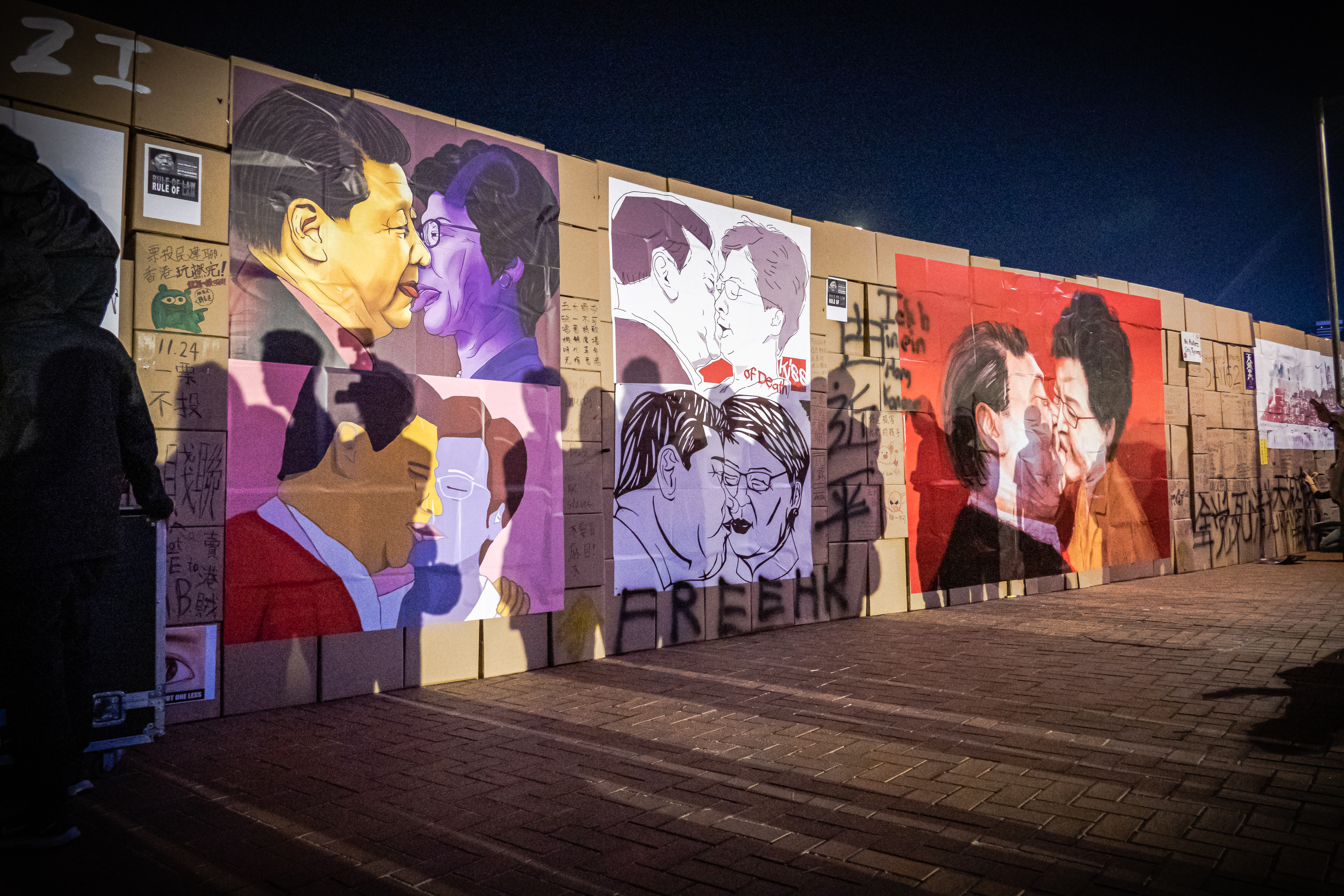
Protest posters parodying My God, Help Me to Survive This Deadly Love

=== 18 November ===
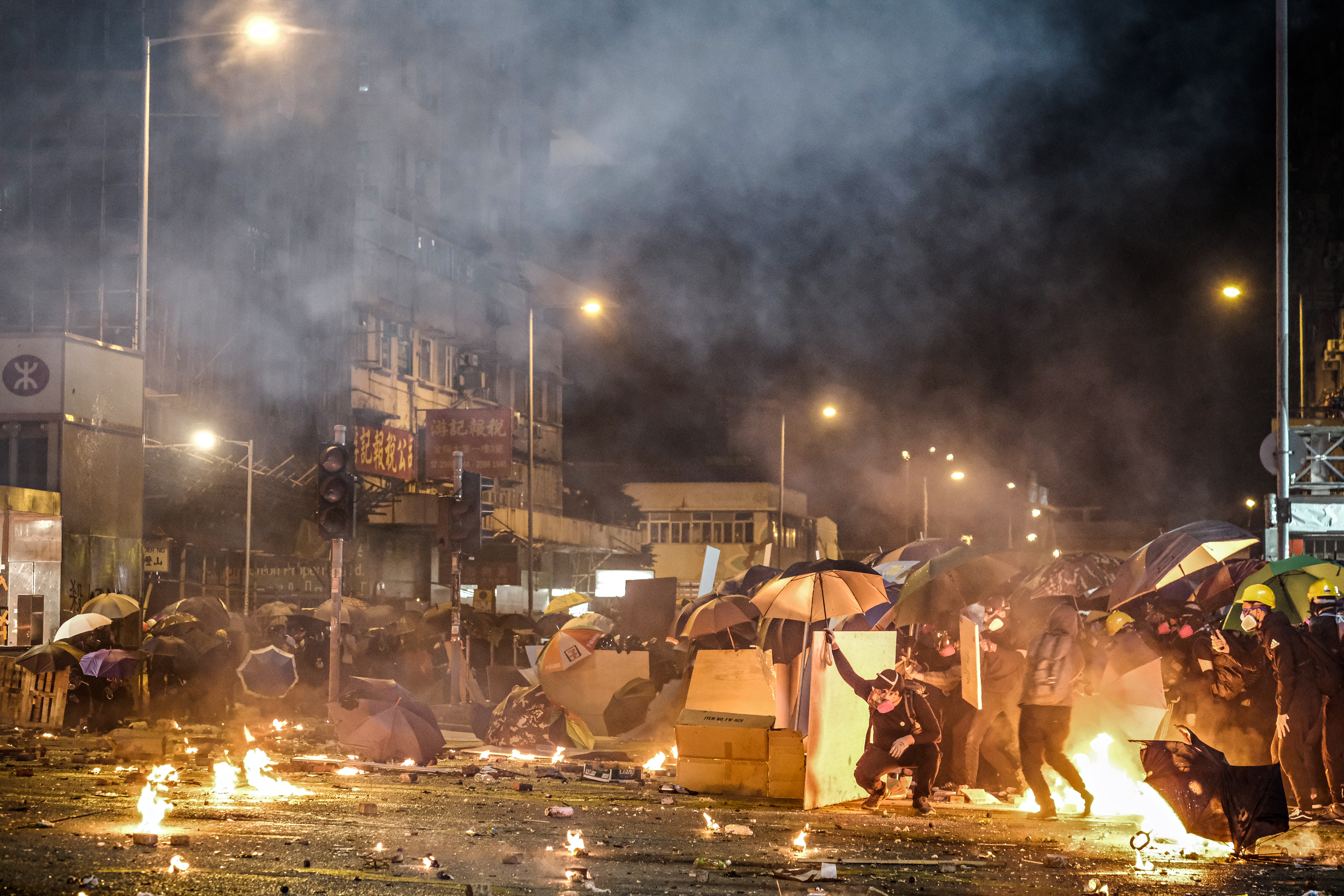
Protesters in Yau Ma Tei as they attempted to breach the police's cordon line to save the protesters trapped inside Hong Kong Polytechnic University.

External videos
- Hong Kong protesters fight with fire as police storm university (AP)

Police entered the PolyU campus at 5:30 am. A number of protesters were quickly arrested; some protesters threw Molotov cocktails at the police officers, while some police officers were seen kicking people on the ground. In a statement, the police denied "raiding" the campus, stating instead that they were conducting an operation on Cheung Wan Road. In a press conference, PolyU student representative Owan Li said police prevented anyone from leaving the university, while Student Union President Derek Liu criticised the police for using "unequal force" and "weapons" to prevent anyone from escaping, saying that the union did not want a Tiananmen Square-like crackdown in Hong Kong. At around 9:30 am, at least 40 people were detained outside Hotel Icon, PolyU's teaching hotel. Student Union vice-president Ken Woo told RTHK that in the morning, at least 500 people remained on campus, while 70 to 100 people attempted to leave but were dispersed by tear gas and had to retreat back to the campus. At 11 am, the Hong Kong Police Force shot tear gas towards Queen Elizabeth Hospital, forcing the hospital to suspend specialist services and to use plastic tape to seal its windows and doors. In Central, lunchtime protests continued, with many showing support for students at PolyU.

The Court of First Instance ruled that the Emergency Regulations Ordinance was partly unconstitutional in encroaching on the Legislative Council's power to make laws, while the government's anti-mask law was unconstitutional in that it "goes further than necessary" in restricting fundamental rights. In response, the police announced that they would suspend enforcing the anti-mask law. The ruling was condemned by mainland Chinese authorities, which said it alone had authority to rule on constitutional matters in Hong Kong.

External videos
- Protesters escaping campus via rope (RTHK)

An estimated 100 secondary school students remained at PolyU in the afternoon. Some of their parents organised a sit-in near the university urging police to allow their children to leave, and about 20 school principals asked the government to allow them to enter the campus to meet their students inside and bring them out. At night, some injured people left the campus with the help of paramedics, though they had to provide their personal information to police before leaving. Another group of protesters escaped the campus by climbing down ropes from a footbridge. These protesters were then driven away with motorbikes on a road below.

Thousands of people gathered on main roads in Kowloon at night, in solidarity with those who remained trapped at PolyU. Protesters threw petrol bombs, while police officers responded with tear gas rounds and water cannon. Footage showed the police allegedly driving a van at high speed into protesters on Nathan Road during their clearance operation. Police arrested 51 people who "claimed to be medics or journalists" at the university, saying that twelve of the purported medics did not have first aid qualifications; the police added that anyone walking out of the university campus would be charged with rioting.

After midnight, more than 100 people left the PolyU campus, after a delegation of secondary school principals negotiated with police to allow minors to leave the campus and return home. Those under 16 were released after having their identities taken, though police reserved the right to prosecute them in the future; whereas, those who were 16 or above were arrested immediately.

==== Court cases ====
In the evening of 18 November, police arrested 213 people in a dispersal operation in the Yau Ma Tei district of Kowloon who had tried to reach PolyU. The operation was directed against what a judge in October 2023 called one of the most violent riots in the history of Hong Kong. All cases in the following paragraph relate to that mass arrest.

On 4 February 2023, eleven people were convicted of rioting, with two of them, who had been carrying cable ties, also convicted of possessing instruments with purpose to damage property. On 11 March 2023 they were sentenced to between 51 and 55 months in jail. Two of those convicted had their bids for leave to appeal rejected on 20 October 2023. On 20 May 2023, 13 people were convicted of rioting. On 26 July 2023, ten people were convicted of rioting, and one in addition for possession of offensive weapon in public place. On 31 October, six of the ten were sentenced to five years in prison for rioting; three others who had previously pleaded guilty received sentences of three years and nine months.

=== 19 November ===
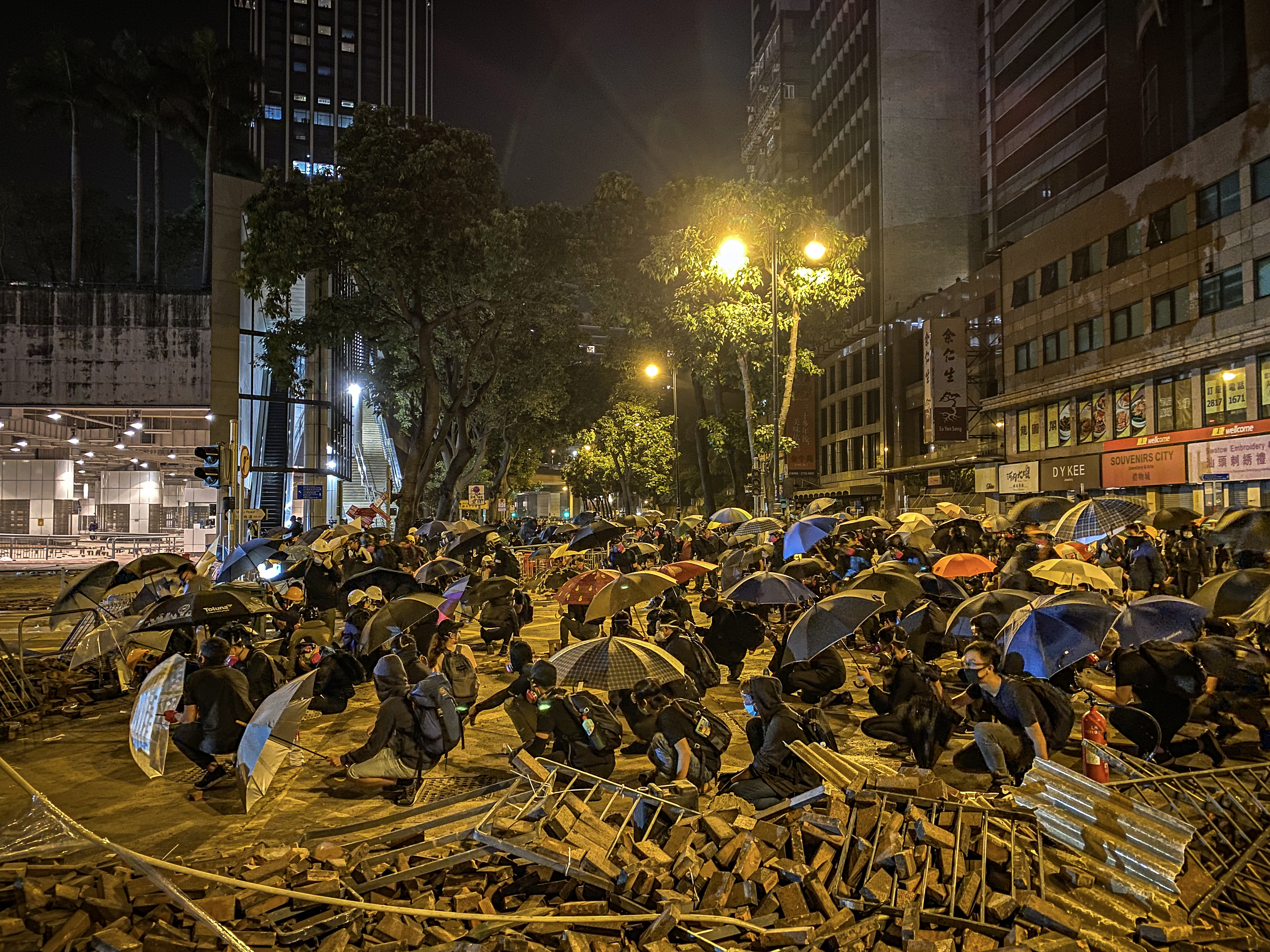
Protesters still outside PolyU

A number of protesters who remained at PolyU attempted to exit the campus through underground sewers. Some of them fell ill and were treated by medics. Divers under the Fire Services Department searched the pipes, but failed to find anyone after two hours of searching.

=== 20 November ===
Primary and secondary school resumed classes. Protesters disrupted MTR train services in the morning, with the Kwun Tong, Island, Tsuen Wan, East and West Rail lines experiencing delays of ten to fifteen minutes. Protesters disrupted the Island line by opening the emergency doors on trains.

=== 21 November ===
Hundreds attended a sit-in at the Yoho Mall in Yuen Long at night, marking four months since the 2019 Yuen Long attack. Other sit-ins were held at MTR stations across Hong Kong. At Heng Fa Chuen, protesters folded origami cranes and told passersby to vote in the district elections. The MTR closed Yuen Long station at 2 pm that day, much earlier than usual and ahead of the planned protest at Yoho Mall. Police arrested at least six people after their dispersal operation in Yuen Long. Organisers announced it was cancelling singer Eason Chan's series of Fear and Dreams concerts, Chan's first concerts held at the Hong Kong Coliseum in six years, due to concerns with public safety. The concerts were originally scheduled over the end of 2019.

=== 22 November ===
Six protesters left PolyU, holding hands, while some others continued to stay in PolyU, saying they have no plans to surrender.

=== 24 November ===
The Hong Kong local elections, which were heavily influenced by the protests, took place. The elections were widely described as a proxy referendum over the protest movement's demands. The elections had a record turnout of over 71 per cent and resulted in a landslide victory for the pro-democracy camp, with them taking control of 17 of the 18 district councils and tripling their seats from about 124 to around 388.

=== 25 November ===
Hundreds of protesters gathered near PolyU trying to get in, but they were blocked by riot police.

=== 26 November ===
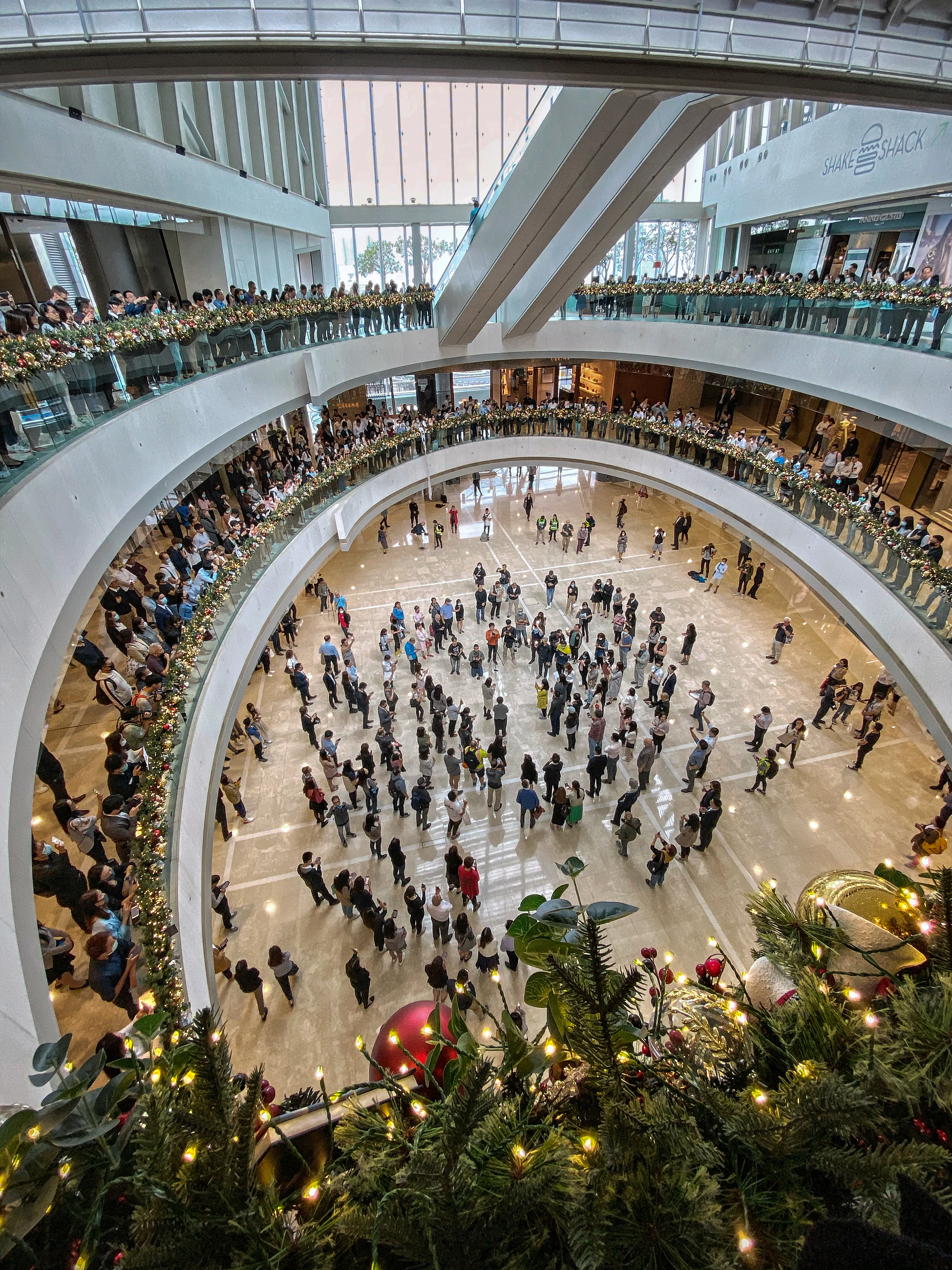
Protesters in the MegaBox Mall (26 November)

Office workers in Central protested, with the rallies spreading over to Kowloon Bay. Workers in office attire, along with other protesters took over some roads near the MegaBox Mall in Kowloon Bay as they shouted slogans accusing police of brutality, as well as in support of the people who've been holed up in Polytechnic University. They chanted slogans such as "five demands, not one less" and "save the students, enter PolyU" as they occupied roads and disrupted traffic.

=== 28 November ===
In response to the Hong Kong Human Rights and Democracy Act being passed by the United States Congress one week prior and signed by President Donald Trump earlier that day, a rally was held at Edinburgh Place to celebrate the Act's enactment. Many participants waved American flags and shouted various slogans. According to the organisers, 100,000 people took part in the rally.

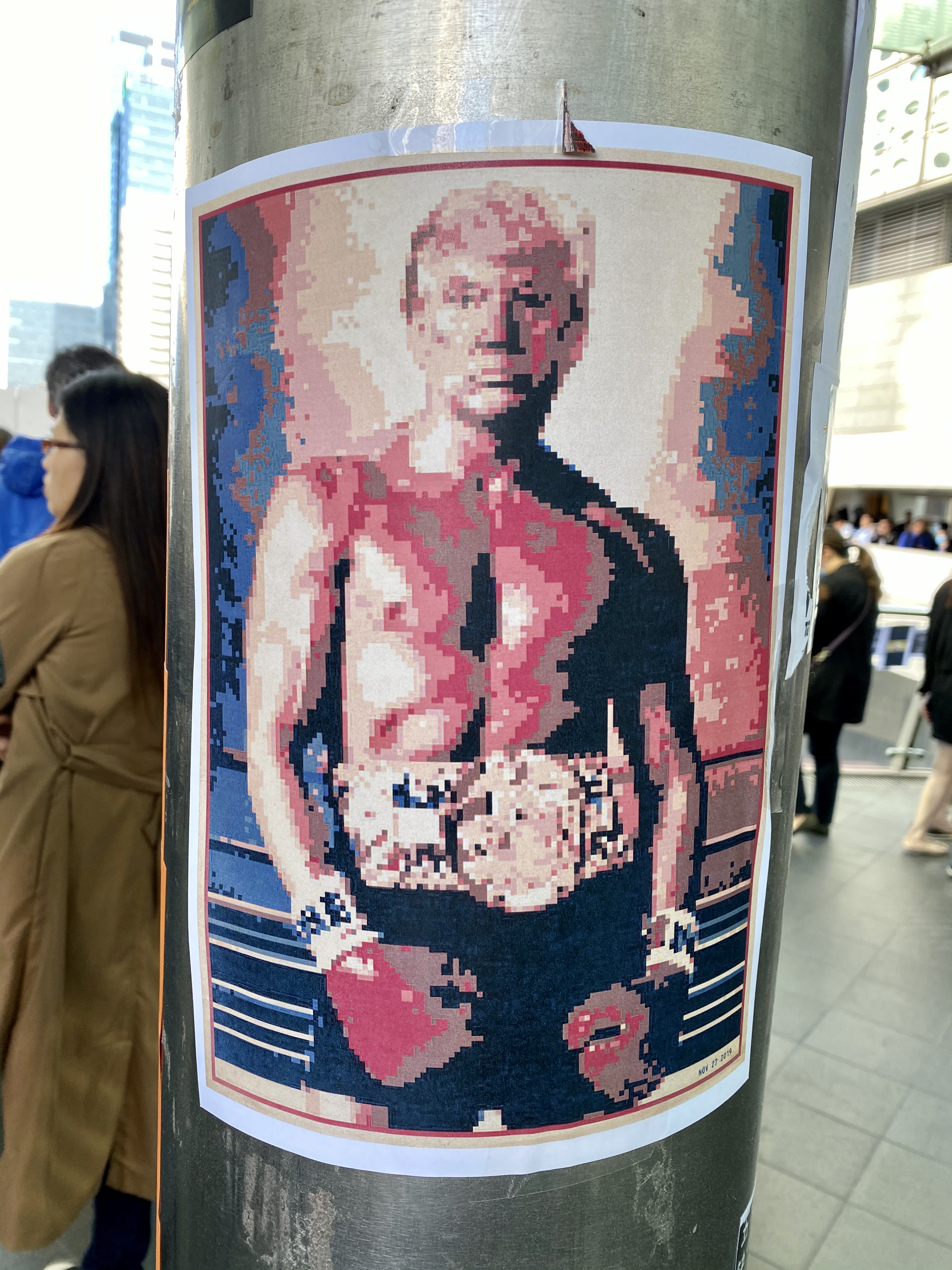
Pixel art of President Donald Trump

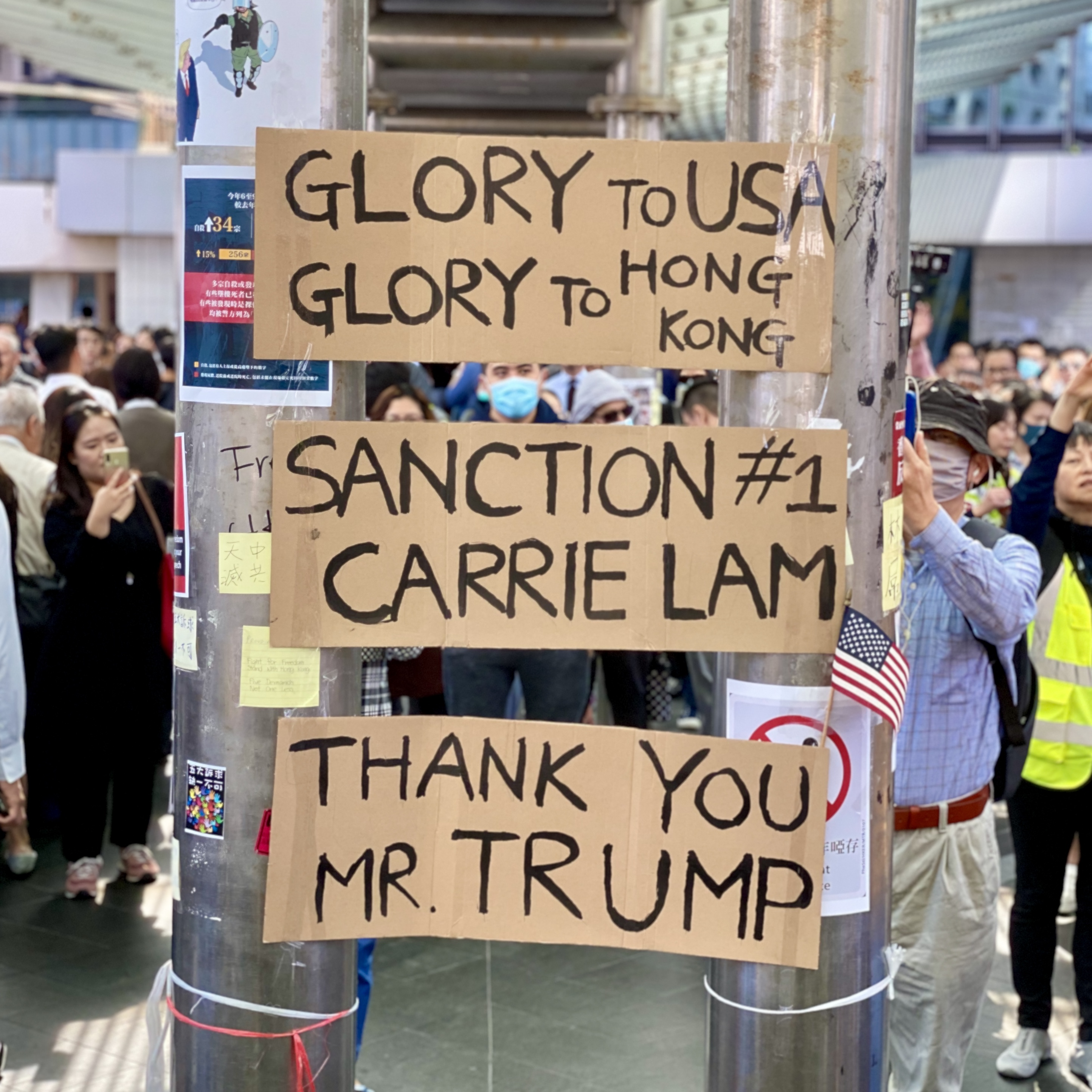
Signs thanking President Donald Trump

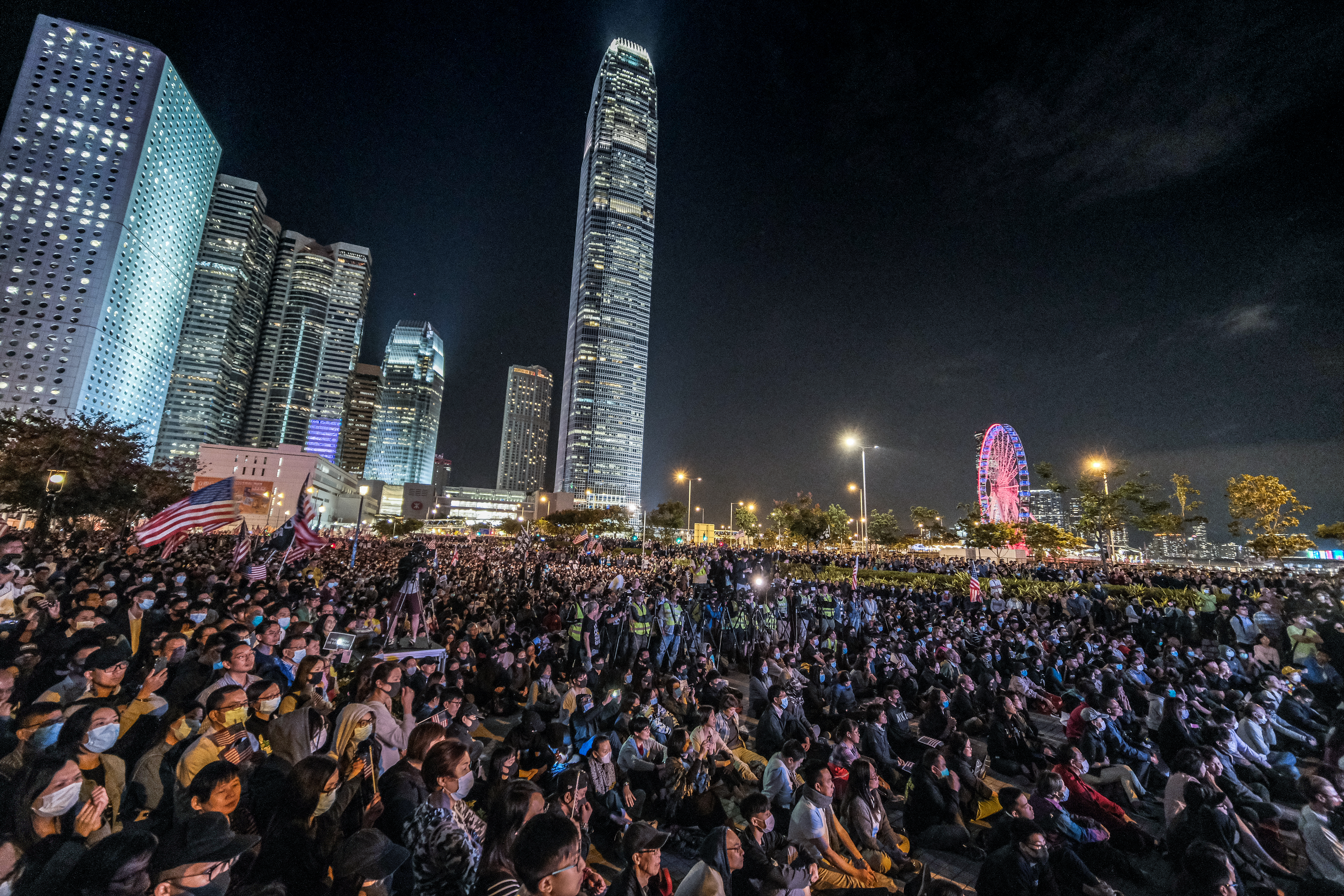
Protesters at night

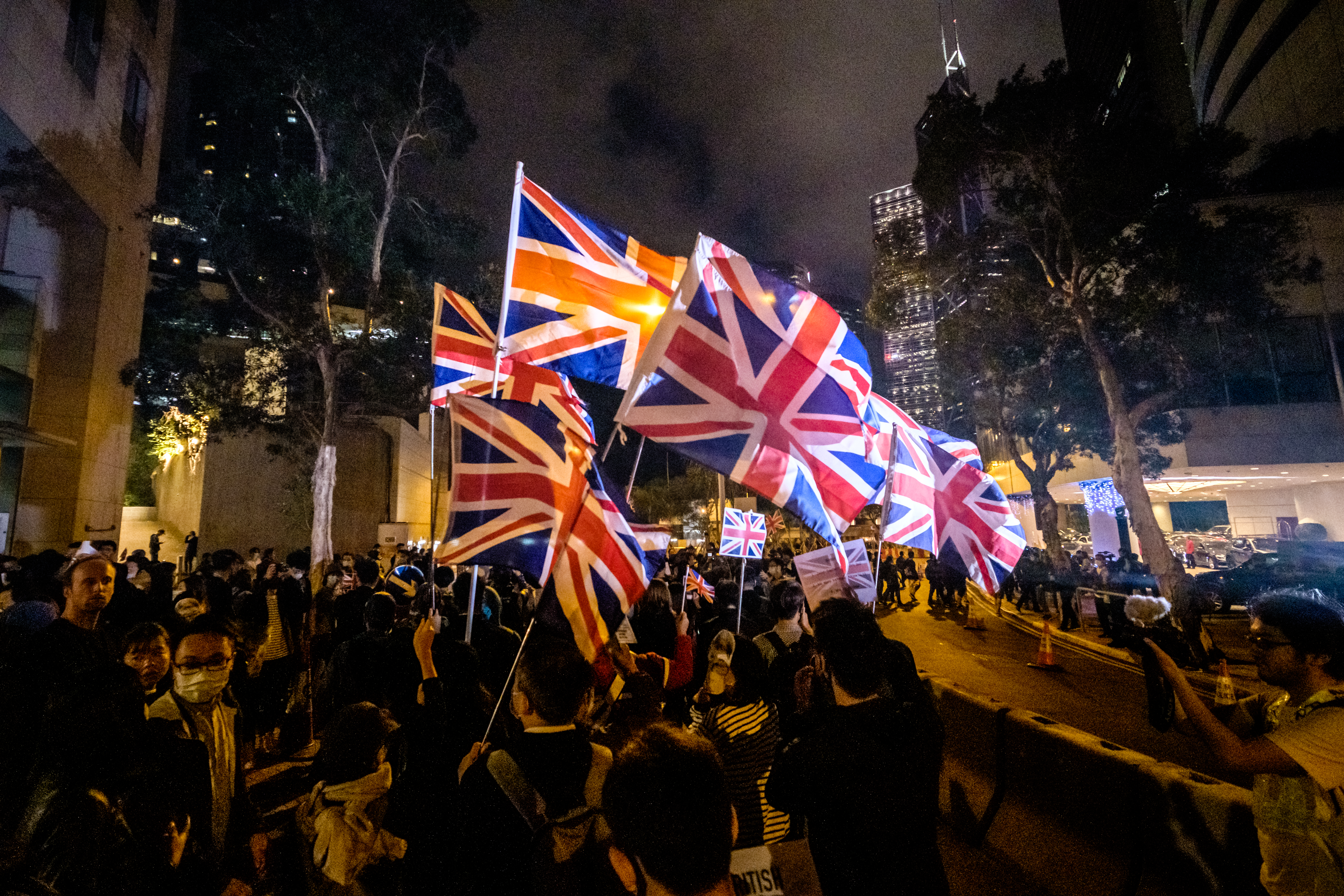
Protesters waving the flag of the United Kingdom

=== 29 November ===
Hundreds protested on the streets of Cheung Sha Wan and Central with posters of Donald Trump after he signed bills on Hong Kong this week. Meanwhile, in Central, hundreds gathered on the pavements of Pedder Street demanding an end to "police brutality". A smaller crowd also gathered in Taikoo.

=== 30 November ===
Hundreds of people of all ages protested in Kowloon Bay in support of the protesters at PolyU. Protesters made makeshift barricades at Prince Edward in the middle of roads. Hundreds of young and old protesters filled Chater Garden in support of the protests. Hundreds of people gathered in Wong Tai Sin to celebrate the results of the election. A civilian was hit in the head with a drain cover while removing the makeshift barricades in Prince Edward after midnight, 1 December. While it sparked a manhunt, no arrest was made.
