= Tuen Mun Catholic Secondary School =

Secondary school in Hong Kong

- 屯門天主教中學
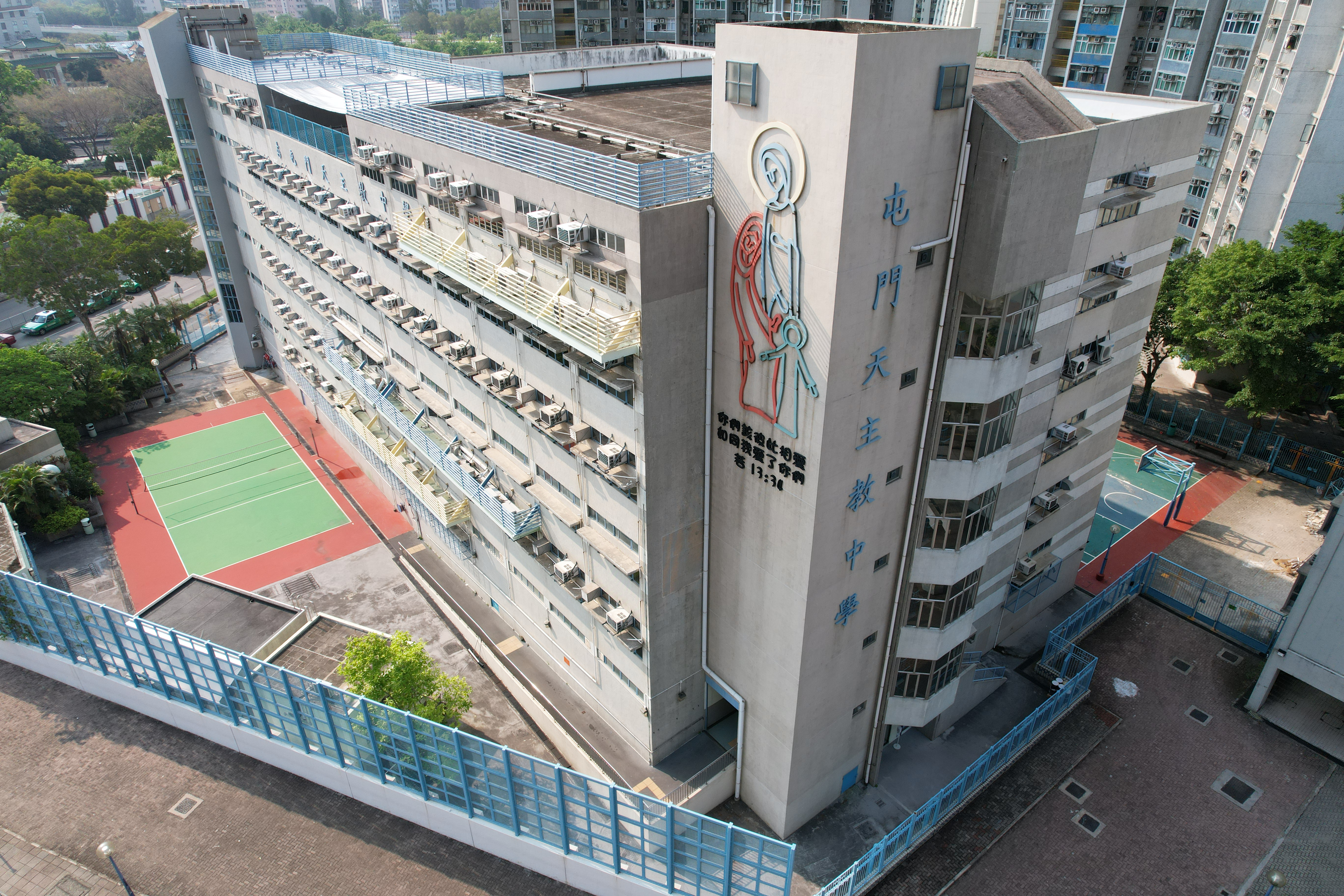
- School building in Kin Sang Estate (2021)

Location
- Kin Sang Estate, Tuen Mun District, New Territories; Hong Kong
- Coordinates: 22.4065°N 113.9710°E

Information
- Type: Government-aided secondary school
- Motto: Truth, Modesty, Constancy, Sincerity (真、謙、恆、誠)
- Religious affiliation: Catholicism
- Established: September 1, 1987
- Principal: Ms. Betty Cheng Suk Wah
- Staff: 61
- Website: www.tmcss.edu.hk

Tuen Mun Catholic Secondary School
- Traditional Chinese: 屯門天主教中學
- Simplified Chinese: 屯门天主教中学
Transcriptions
Standard Mandarin
- Hanyu Pinyin: Tún Mén Tiānzhǔjiào Zhōngxué
Yue: Cantonese
- Jyutping: Tyun4 mun4 tin1 zyu2 gaau3 zung1 hok6

Tuen Mun Catholic Secondary School (TMCSS; Chinese: 屯門天主教中學) is a co-educational Roman Catholic secondary school located in Kin Sang Estate, Tuen Mun, Hong Kong. It is one of 23 secondary schools sponsored by the Catholic Diocese of Hong Kong.

As of May 2026, Betty Cheng Suk Wah is the principal. She previously served as the Vice Principal of Chan Sui Ki (La Salle) College and is a recognized advocate for flipped learning and AI in education.

== History ==
Established on 1 September 1987, the school initially operated only Form 1 classes at a temporary campus. The current school building in Kin Sang Estate was inaugurated in September 1988, coinciding with the introduction of Form 4 classes. Matriculation classes (Form 6 and 7) were provided from 1992 until the transition to the New Senior Secondary curriculum in 2012.

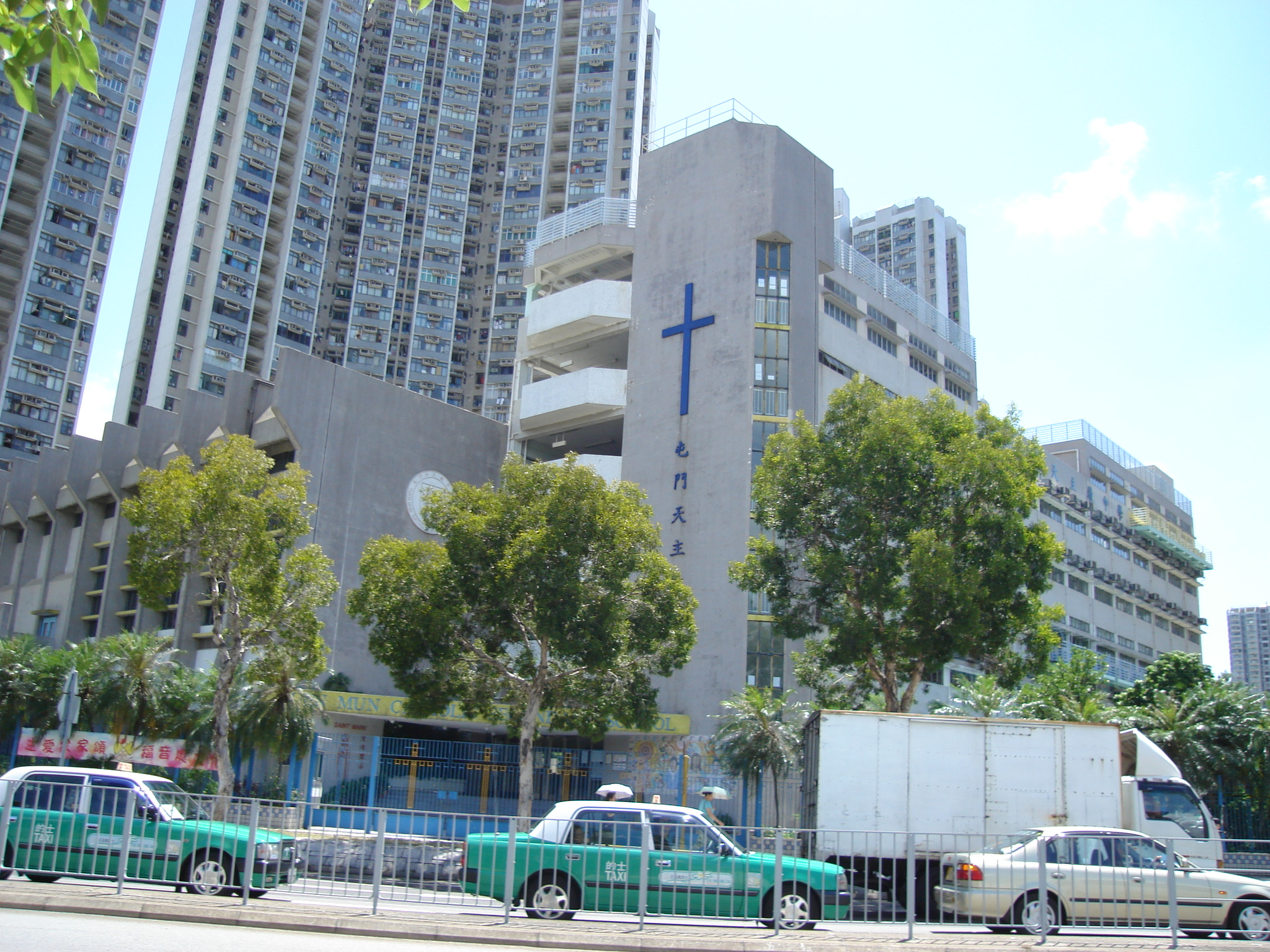
Tuen Mun Catholic Secondary School in July 2007.
