= Timeline of the 2019–2020 Hong Kong protests (October 2019) =

October events of the 2019–2020 pro-democracy demonstrations in Hong Kong

Timeline of the 2019–2020 Hong Kong protests
2019			March–June				July	August	September	October	November	December
2020	January	February	March	April	May	June	July	August	September	October	November	December
2021	January	February	March	April	May	June	July	August	September–November			December

In October 2019, the 2019–2020 Hong Kong protests saw a further escalation of violence. It became evident that the protests were unlikely to end soon, and that they posed the biggest popular challenge to Chinese Communist Party (CCP) leader Xi Jinping since his ascension to CCP general secretary in 2012. To bring the situation under control, Chief Executive Carrie Lam invoked colonial-era powers to impose an anti-mask law, aimed at preventing protesters from hiding their identity. Observers considered the law, which came into force on 4 October, as a precedent for possible wider use of emergency powers at the expense of citizens' freedoms and in addition democratic rights, as they even saw the possibility of the upcoming District Council elections being cancelled based on the emergency law. The mask ban did, however, not achieve the desired effect, but rather proved a further focal point of protests. In November, the High Court ruled the mask ban to be unconstitutional, although in April 2020, an Appeal Court ruled that it was constitutional in the case of unlawful assemblies.

The month began with major protests in several parts of the city on occasion of the Chinese National Day. On that day, for the first time in the protests, a protester was shot by police; he was critically injured in the torso, but survived. Police defended this use of potentially lethal force against accusations that it had been disproportionate. Another act of violence that stood out was the slashing of a police officer on 13 October. On 6 October, a taxi driver caused serious leg injuries to a woman when he drove into a crowd of protesters, an act which was seen by protesters as deliberate. On the same day, there was a first confrontation of protesters with the Chinese People's Liberation Army when protesters targeted their Kowloon Tong barracks with laser lights and were shown warnings from inside in response.

== Events ==
=== 1 October National Day protests ===
On the 70th anniversary of the founding of the People's Republic of China, Hong Kong protesters marked a "national day of mourning". In defiance of a police ban on the annual march that the Civil Human Rights Front (CHRF) had applied for, four veteran democrats led a rally from Causeway Bay to Central, mourning the victims of Chinese Communist Party rule and calling for the end of one-party rule in mainland China. Simultaneously, protesters held rallies in Wong Tai Sin, Tuen Mun, Tsuen Wan, Sha Tin and Sham Shui Po, which drew tens of thousands of participants altogether. The protests were initially peaceful, but violent incidents occurred later during the day. MTR stations and businesses that were thought to be associated with the mainland were vandalised.

External videos
- Footage of the shooting incident (HKFP)

Officers had fired multiple warning shots in locations such as Yau Ma Tei and Wong Tai Sin. In Tsuen Wan, a police officer fired a live round at Tsang Chi-kin, an 18-year-old male secondary school student, to his chest at point blank range with a revolver. This incident happened as the man was assaulting the police officer who ran in to retrieve a fellow officer chased and beaten to the ground by a crowd of protesters. Before being shot, the student was holding a white pipe and a kickboard; when collecting evidence after the shooting, the police took away his mask, his helmet, his kickboard along with a metal rod found from nearby, but without his white pipe. It was the first live round fired at a person by the Hong Kong police in this series of protests. The protester was taken to the emergency room of Princess Margaret Hospital and in critical condition. The Hong Kong Police called the shooting "heartbreaking" and added that "[t]he police officers' lives were seriously threatened. To save his own and his colleagues' lives, [the officer] fired a live shot at the attacker." The Foreign Secretary of the United Kingdom Dominic Raab said that "the use of live ammunition is disproportionate". Human rights organisation Amnesty International urged "the Hong Kong authorities to urgently review their approach in policing the protests to de-escalate the situation and prevent more lives being put at risk" and reiterated its call for an independent investigation. Away from the city's protest scenes, the profane phrase "Celebrate His Mom" (「賀佢老母」) showed up in the form of a massive, black vertical protest banner on Devil's Peak. At the same time, Hong Kong citizens crowdfunded to buy whole-page newspaper advertisements on over nine newspapers in different countries to "showcase" this phrase globally. The countries included South Korea, Spain, Sweden, Norway, United Kingdom, Germany, Canada, Argentina, and Mexico.

On 28 January 2022, eleven of the protesters in Wong Tai Sin were found guilty of rioting while one was acquitted. On 1 April, three of the group were sentenced to a training centre, with judge Edmond Lee citing their young age and the brevity of their riot as mitigating factors. Tsang Chi-kin was sentenced on 18 October 2023 to 3.5 years in prison for rioting and assaulting a police officer, and to 11 months and two weeks for perverting the course of justice, after having pleaded guilty to all three charges the previous month. According to police, he and three others had hidden in safe houses for two years until their arrest in July 2022; Yip Ho and Ansen Wong were jailed for 20 and 10 months respectively for perverting the course of justice, with Ho having been accused of having helped to conceal the group. Seventeen-year-old Alex Wong was sentenced to a training centre for perverting the course of justice. Fung Ching-Wah, another of the four who had hidden, had been sentenced to four months in jail in September 2023 for rioting and perverting the course of justice.

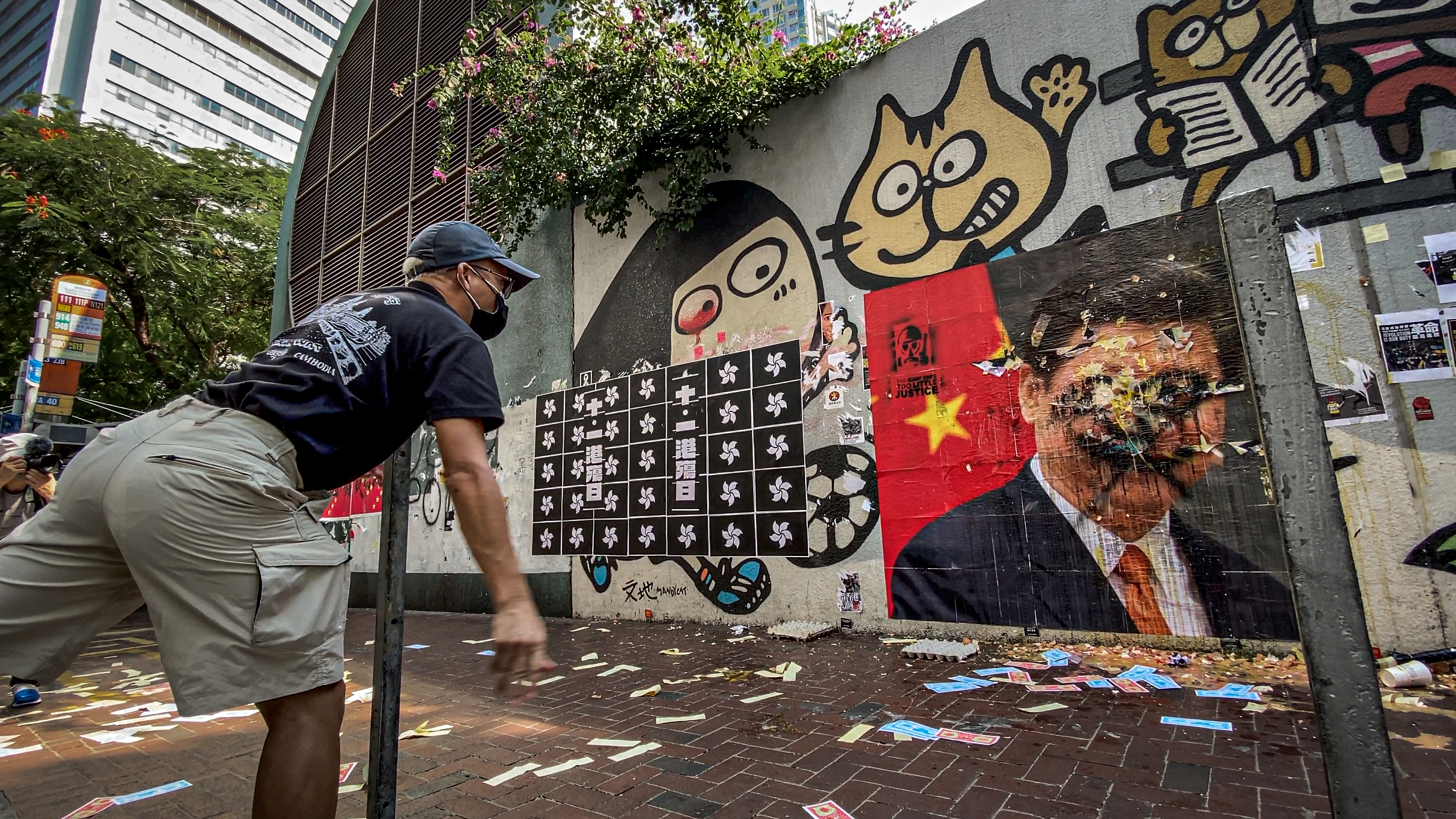
Protesters throwing eggs at a portrait of Communist Party general secretary Xi Jinping

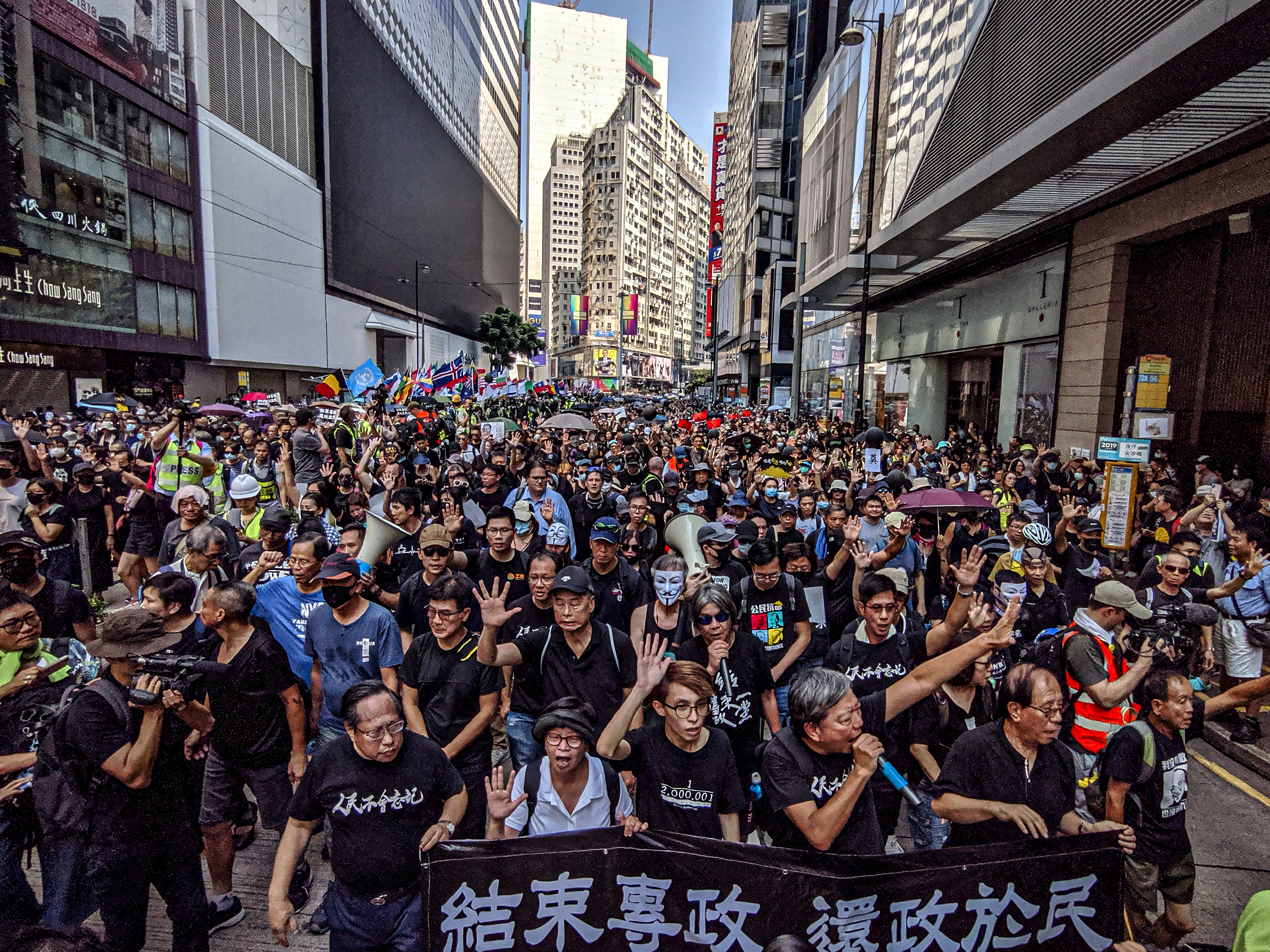
Protesters marching in Causeway Bay

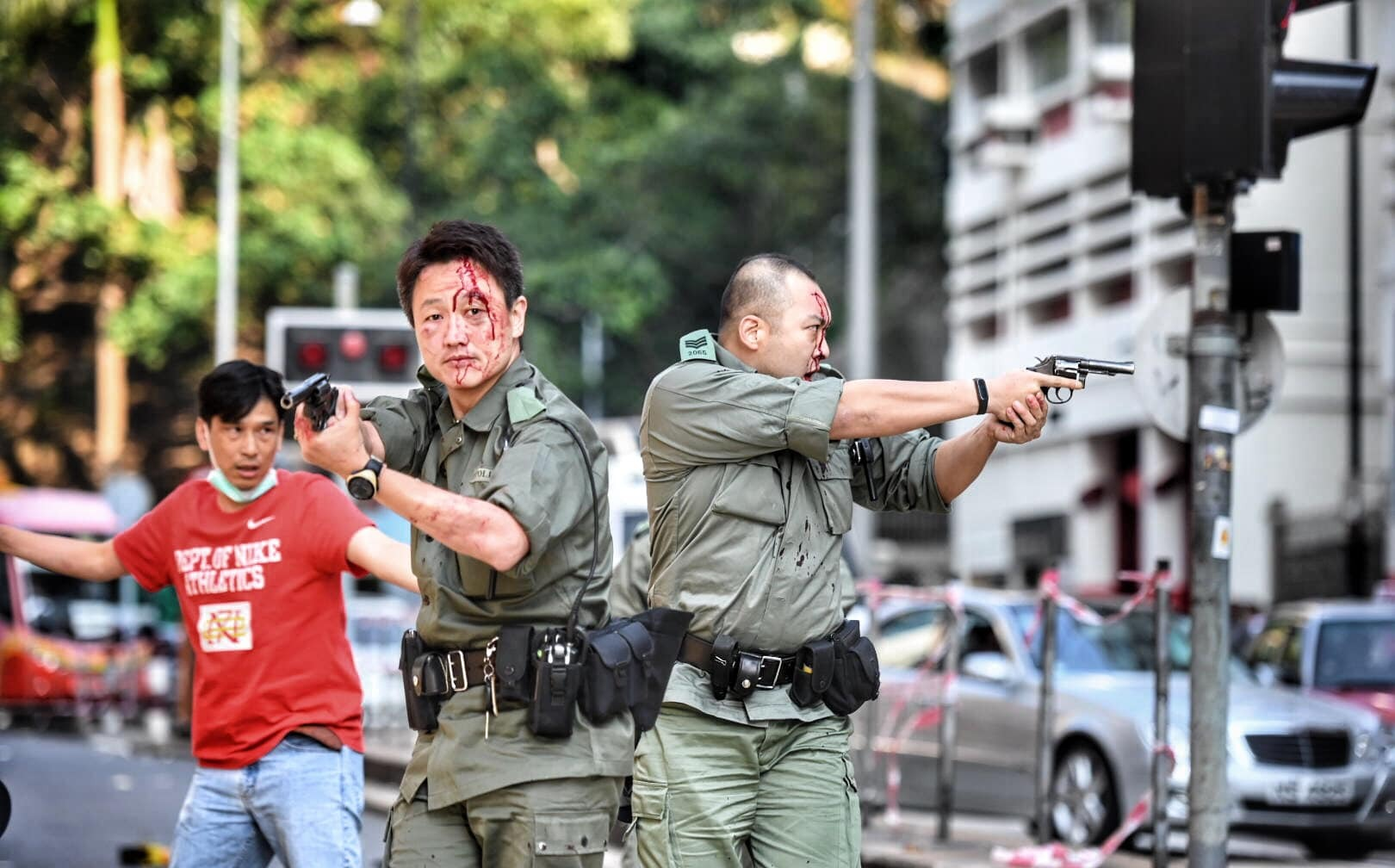
Two police officers firing warning shots to the sky then pointing to protesters in Yau Ma Tei

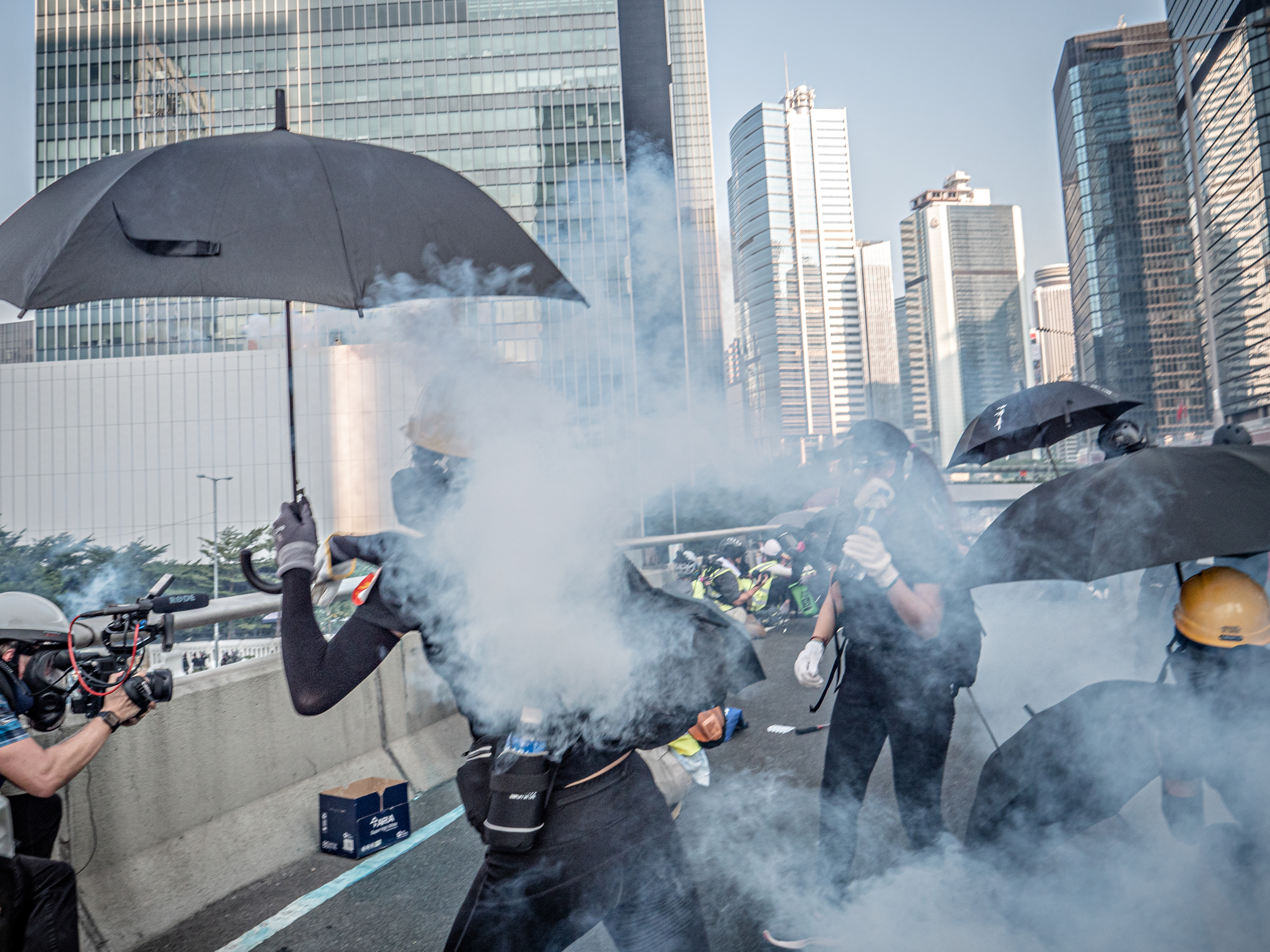
Police shooting tear gas canister to protesters

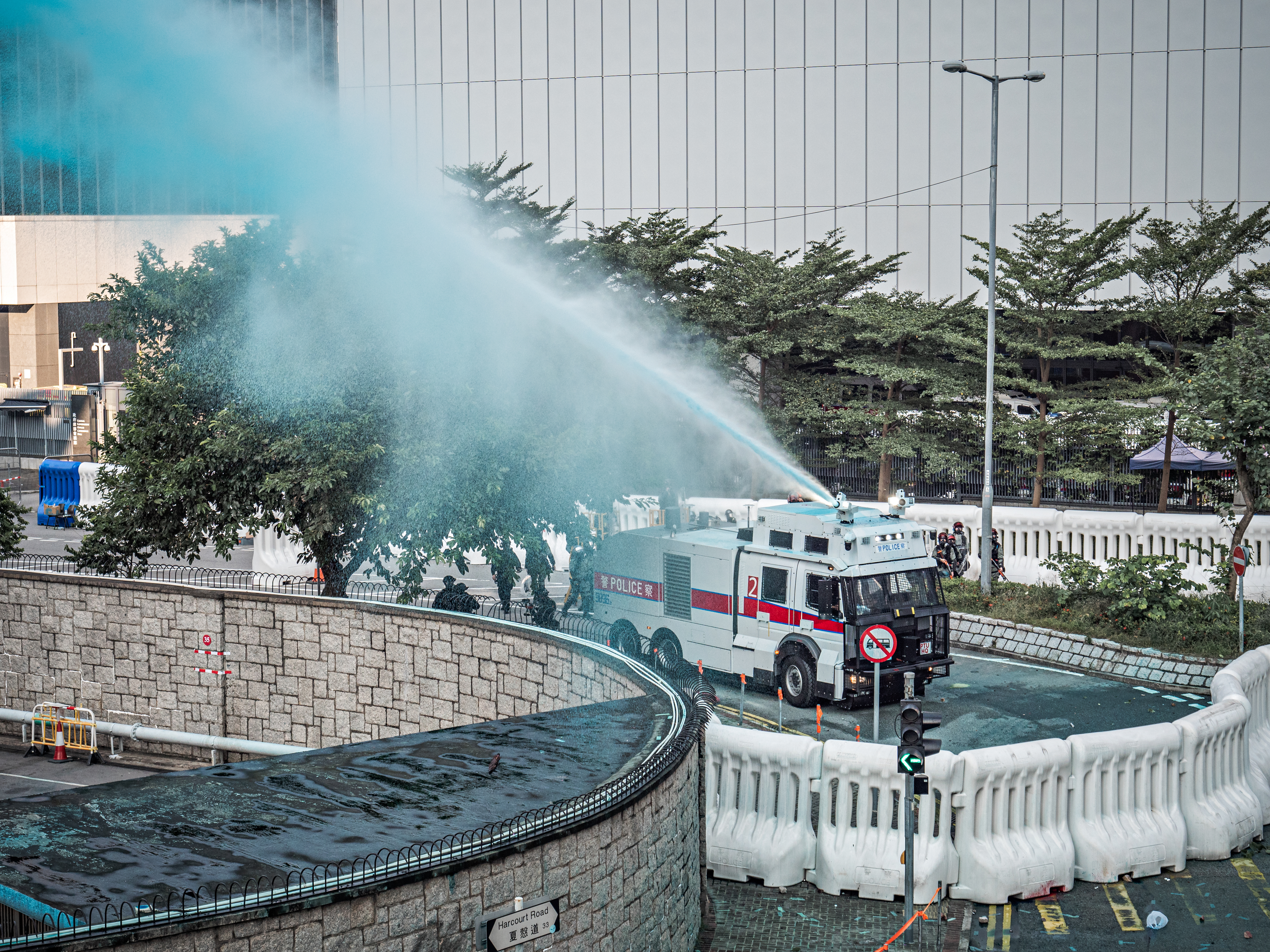
Police using blue-dye water cannon to disperse protesters

=== 2 October solidarity protests for the injured student ===
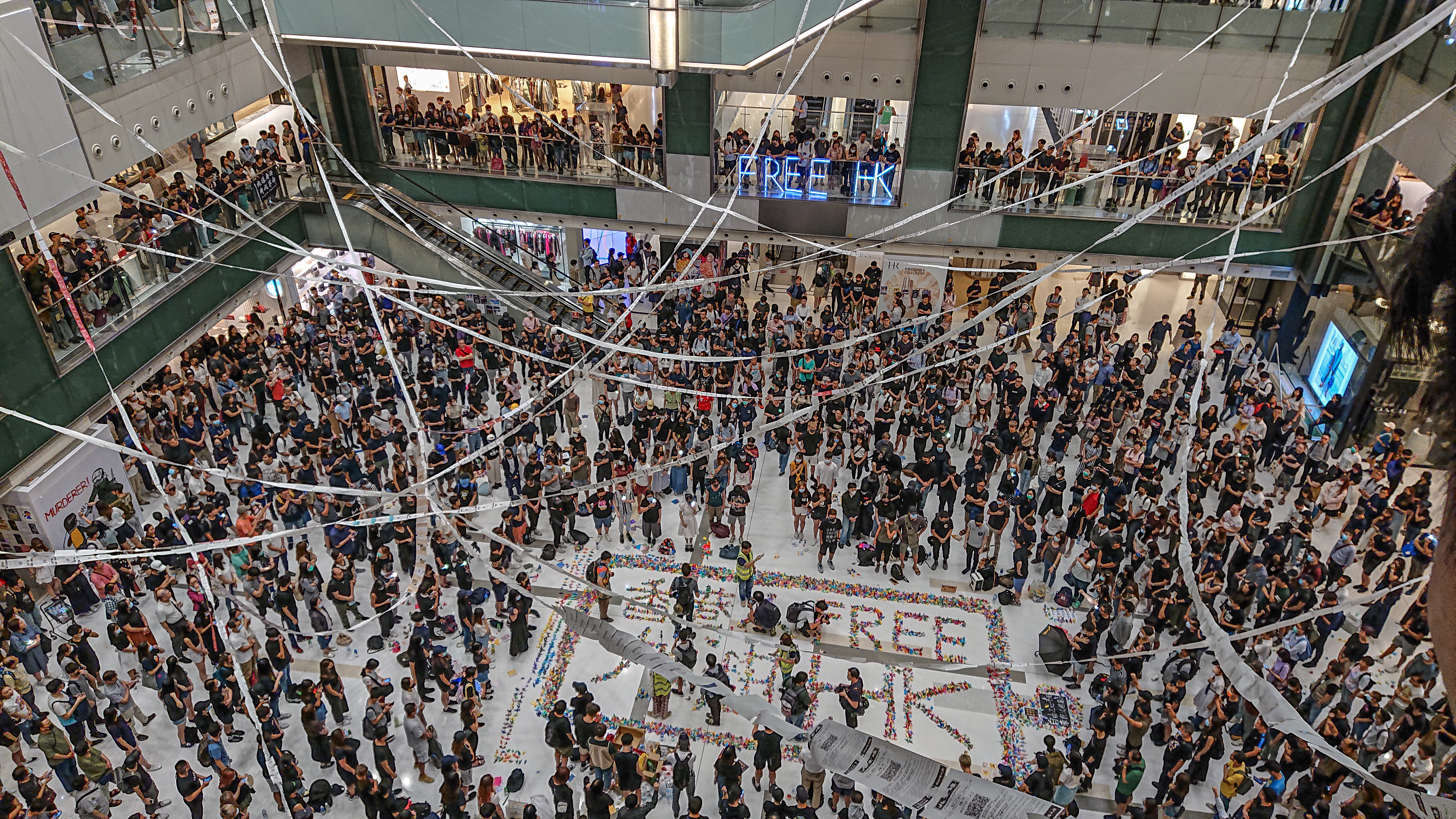
Protesters gathered inside New Town Plaza, a shopping mall in Sha Tin, while folding paper birds.

Protests continued after Tsang was shot by the police. The students and the alumni of his secondary school Tsuen Wan Public Ho Chuen Yiu Memorial College rallied outside the campus to show their support for Tsang, who was charged with rioting and assaulting officers while still in hospital. About 250 demonstrators gathered at West Kowloon Magistrates' Courts to support him and other protesters who were arrested.

In the afternoon, protesters and office workers gathered in Central, Hong Kong and briefly occupied Connaught Road Central. They shouted slogans to condemn the Hong Kong police, such as "Hong Kong police intentionally commit murder" and "disband the police force now". Protesters also showed up in Tsuen Wan, where they damaged a mahjong house said to have links to triad groups and started a fire near New Territories South Regional Police Headquarters. Protesters also briefly occupied roads and thoroughfares in Wong Tai Sin and Causeway Bay. In Tuen Mun, Tai Wai and Tseung Kwan O, protesters vandalised several MTR stations. Railway operator MTR Corporation became a target of vandalism after it was accused of cooperating with the police and closing its stations before major protests took place.

=== 3 October protests against anti-mask law ===
On 3 October, protesters gathered at 11 shopping malls throughout Hong Kong, including New Town Plaza, Yoho Mall and APM to protest against the anti-mask law. The gathering in Cityplaza near Tai Koo station escalated into intense conflicts between protesters and the police, which used tear gas and pepper spray to disperse protesters. At 10:20 pm, the MTR announced that it would close the Kwun Tong station, in response to which protesters nearby damaged its facilities. The MTR then announced the imminent closure of Tai Po Market station, Ngau Tau Kok station and Tai Koo station.

=== 4–6 October protests against the emergency law ===
==== 4 October ====
After Carrie Lam invoked the controversial Emergency Regulations Ordinance to impose a law which bans the wearing of face masks in public gatherings, many protesters defied the new law and wore face masks to show their discontent. Protesters first showed up in Central, Hong Kong and chanted slogans, such as "Hong Kong people, resist". After the government announced the enactment of the law, which would be effective the following midnight, many universities cancelled their afternoon classes and many malls closed early. The protesters became more radical at night and showed up in various districts in Hong Kong. Protesters occupied Harcourt Road, Nathan Road, Lung Cheung Road and other major thoroughfares. They also damaged facilitates in several railway stations and Light Rail stations, causing the MTR to suspend all of its train services that day. Pro-Beijing shops and corporations thought to have ties to Mainland China, such as Bank of China and Maxim's Catering, were vandalised.

The riot police confronted the protesters in Aberdeen and fired the first tear gas canister in the Southern District. In Yuen Long, an off-duty officer was cornered and assaulted by the protesters after being suspected of bumping into protesters in his car. During the altercation, he shot a teenage boy with live ammunition in his left thigh, and then was further assaulted by protesters, having petrol bombs thrown at him. The police issued a statement saying that the officer acted in self-defence. The boy was admitted to Tuen Mun Hospital. After midnight, riot police officers with full gear entered the hospital. Hospital Authority expressed concerns regarding the police's presence in the hospital because its staff and patients feared that they might obstruct the hospital's operations.

The following day, many MTR stations, banks, and shops remained closed. Lam said that the law was invoked only to quell the violence and insisted that Hong Kong was not in a state of emergency, despite the use of the emergency regulations ordinance. Reuters described the introduction of the anti-mask law as "counterproductive or even inflammatory", while Vox opined that the new law might further infuriate the protesters.

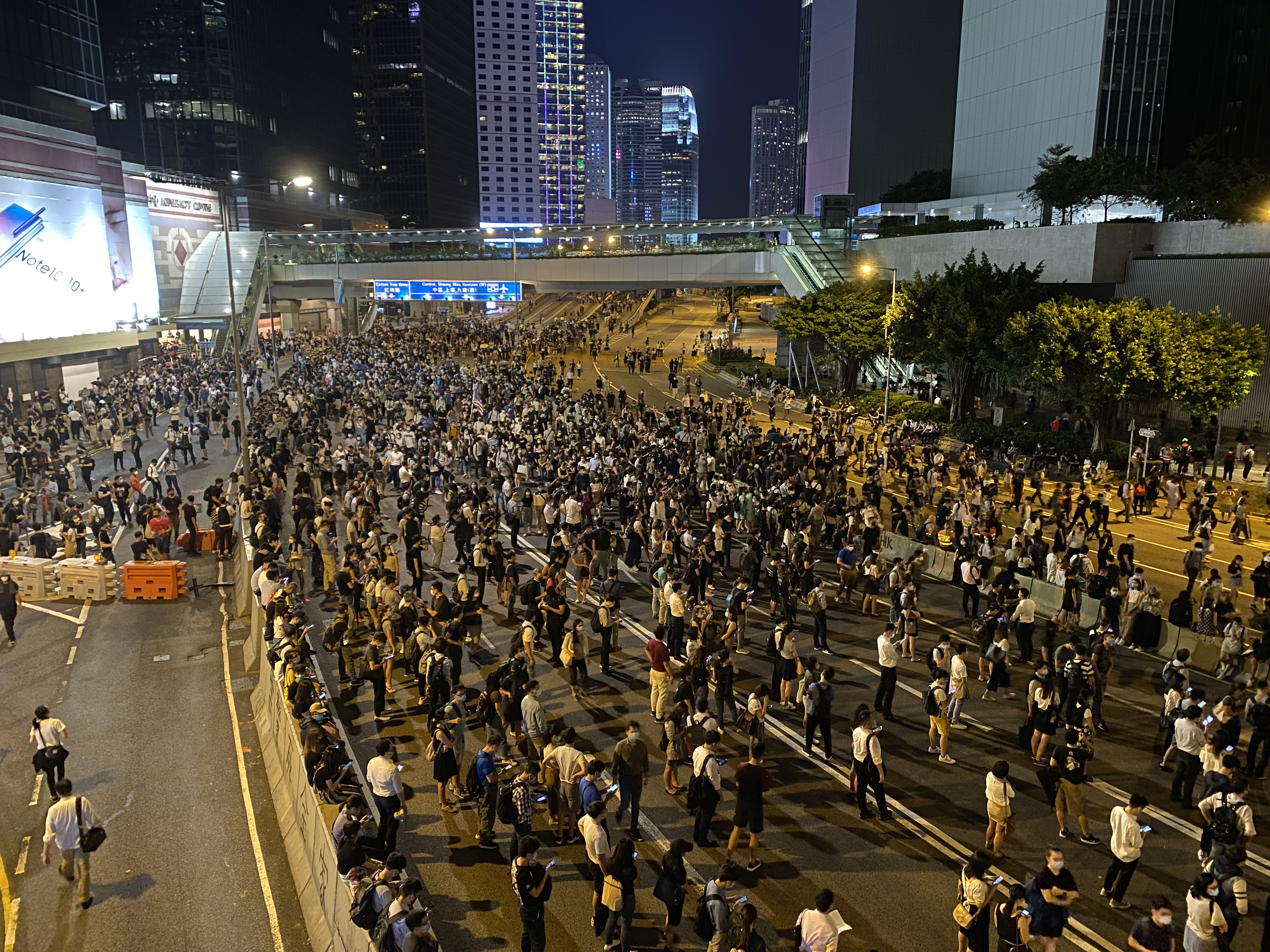
Protesters in Harcourt Road.

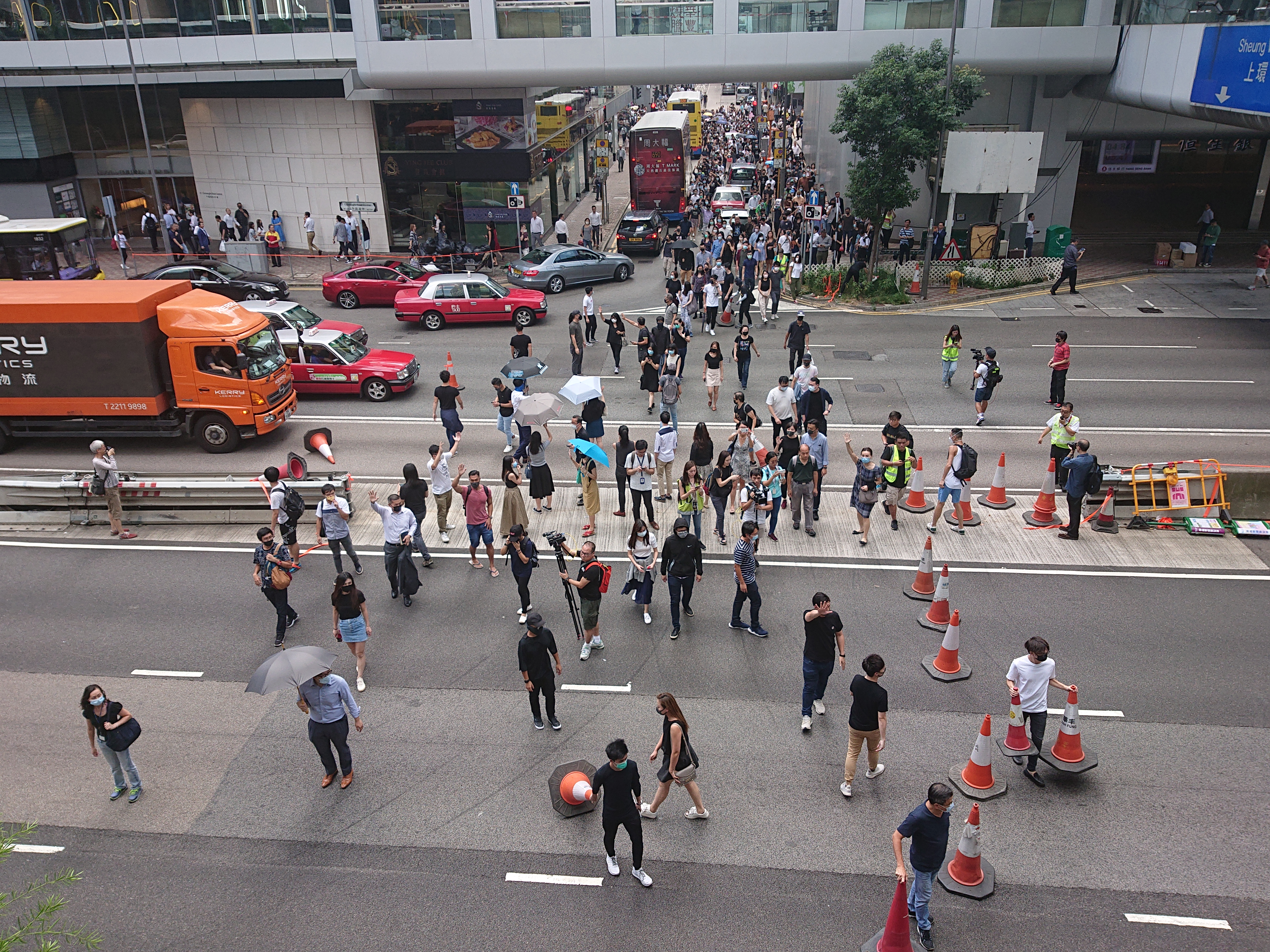
Protesters setting up roadblocks in Connaught Road, Central.

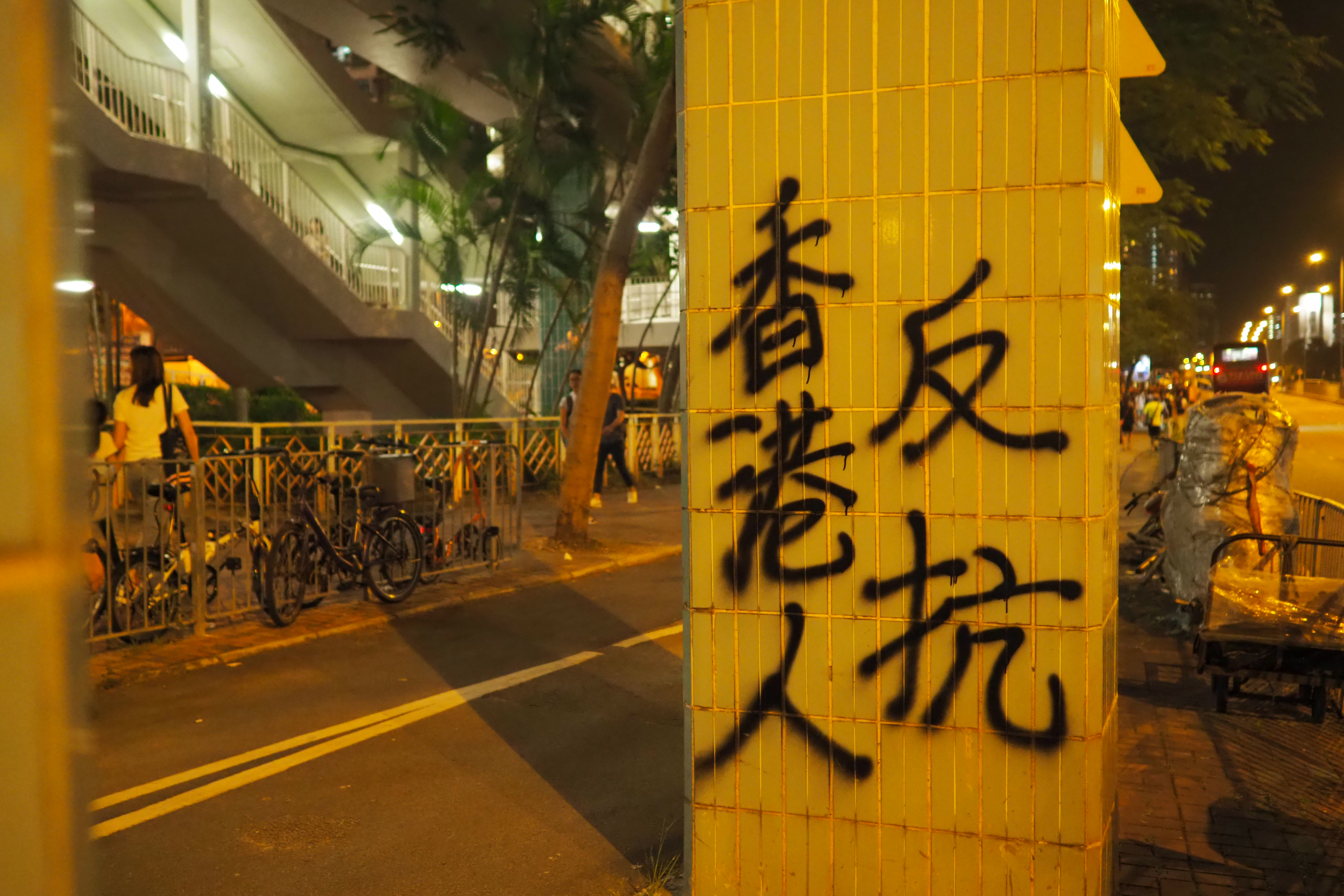
Graffiti on a wall, translates as "Hongkongers, revolt".

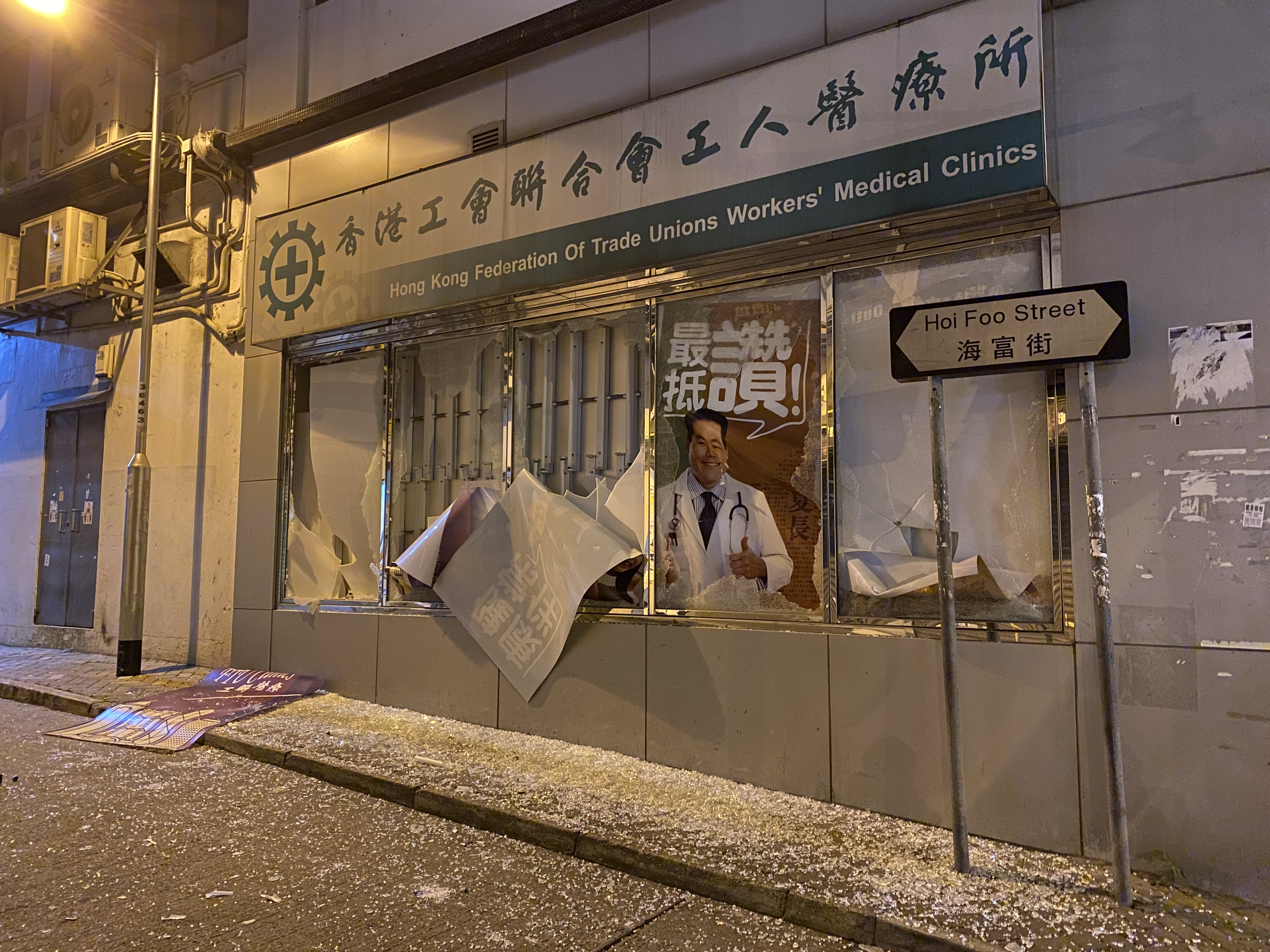
A pro-Beijing organisation office vandalised by protesters.

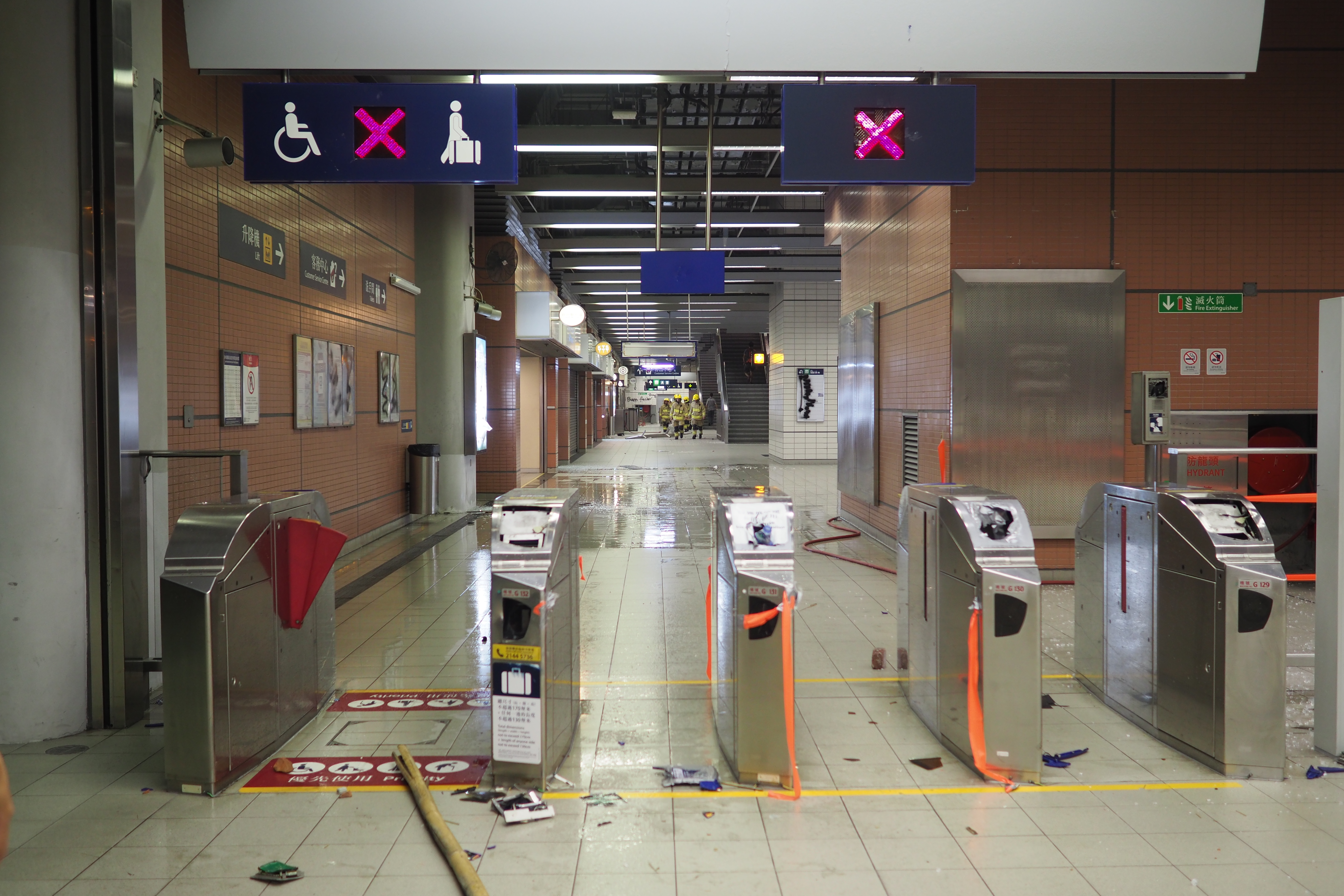
An MTR station vandalised by protesters.

==== 5 October ====
Protesters staged demonstrations in various districts across the city, setting barricades on main thoroughfares and blocking traffic. Dozens of protesters occupied Castle Peak Road in Yuen Long, singing and chanting anti-government slogans. Several dozen protesters also blocked Lung Cheung Road at Wong Tai Sin, throwing "hell money" and disrupting traffic at some point. Meanwhile, barricades were put up on Nathan Road in Mong Kok, with protesters also surrounding the Mong Kok police station and hurling abuses.

A very large group of people, which some reports said numbered in thousands, started a defiant march in Causeway Bay to express their opposition to the government's introduction of the anti-mask law. Many of the protesters were wearing face masks, an act that had become illegal as per the emergency laws. Several hundred masked protesters formed a human chain and moved from Tsim Sha Tsui to Sham Shui Po, also in a demonstration against the government's new anti-face mask law.

==== 6 October ====
Protesters marched on the streets of Hong Kong Island and Kowloon on 6 October to protest Lam's decision to invoke the emergency law. Protesters continued to wear different types of face masks in defiance of the anti-mask law. The march was largely peaceful until the police confronted the protesters and began shooting tear gas canisters. Hardline protesters began hurling objects and petrol bombs at the police while the latter deployed water cannons to disperse protesters. A RTHK reporter caught fire and suffered burns to his face after being hit by a Molotov cocktail in Wan Chai. RTHK condemned the use of violence and called all parties to show restraint.

In an escalation of conflict in Sham Shui Po district in Kowloon, a taxi under attack from some protesters, inadvertently rammed into a crowd and severely injured a female protester. The driver, who was pulled out of the cab and immediately surrounded by a large crowd and badly beaten, was admitted to hospital with several rib fractures. The driver said he had lost HK$20,000 ($2,550) in cash and a watch valued at HK$140,000 during the course of the incident; his taxi was also damaged. Police classified the case as "rioting, wounding, criminal damage, theft, and traffic accident causing injury". Protesters accused the taxi driver of deliberately ramming his car into the crowd of protesters. Actress Celine Ma was attacked by protesters after she filmed the protesters vandalising a Bank of China ATM in Mong Kok with her phone and provoked the protesters by attempting to punch and kick one of them.

In Kowloon Tong, police arrested several students and entered the Hong Kong Baptist University campus without permission. At night, the garrison of People's Liberation Army raised a warning flag against the protesters who were shining laser light on the exteriors of the garrison building, marking the first military response during the protest.

On 23 April 2022, a district judge convicted 11 people for rioting in Wan Chai. On 30 June 2022, another man was sentenced to 43 months in prison for rioting.

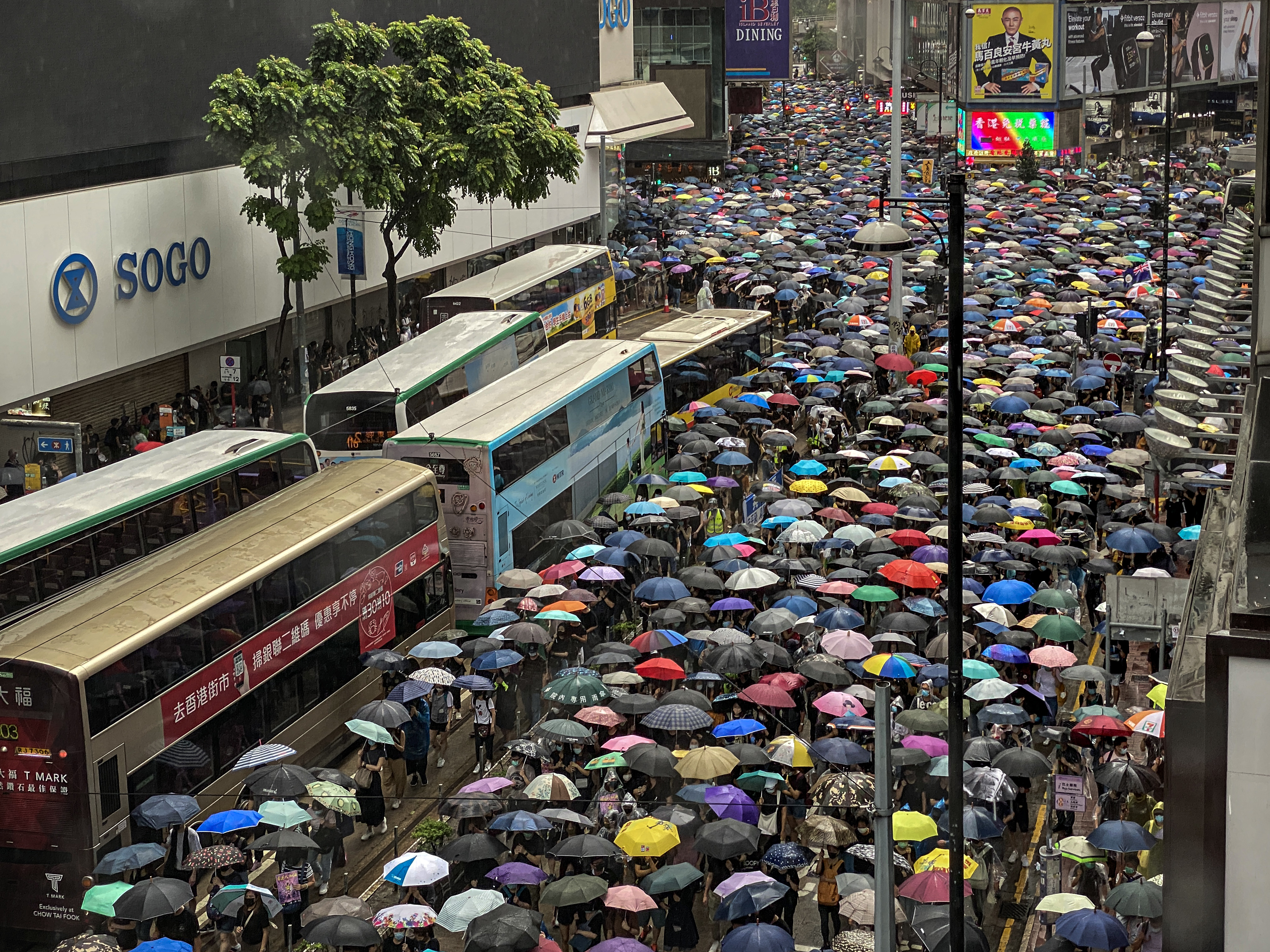
Protesters marching in Causeway Bay

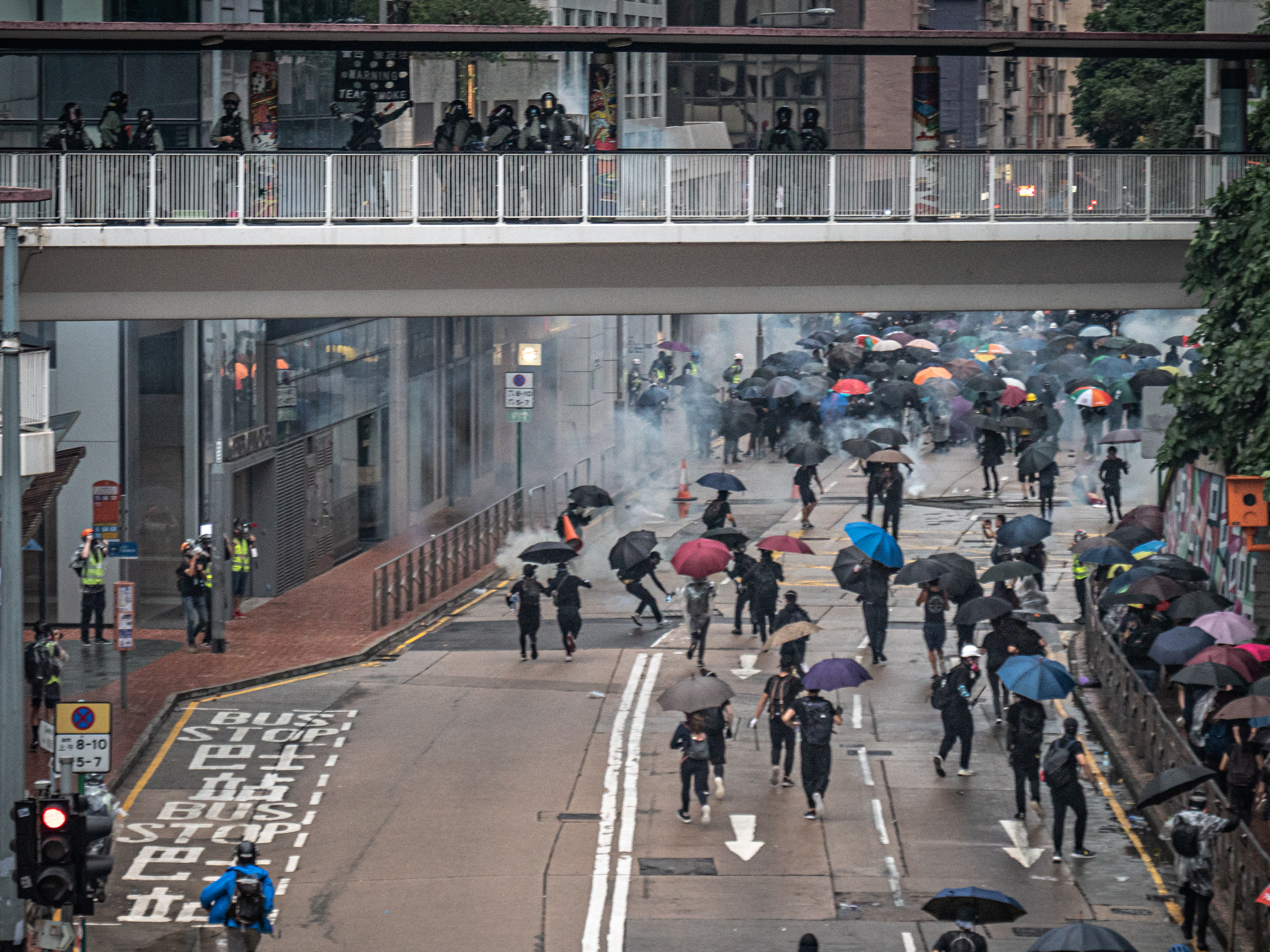
Police disperse crowd with tear gas.

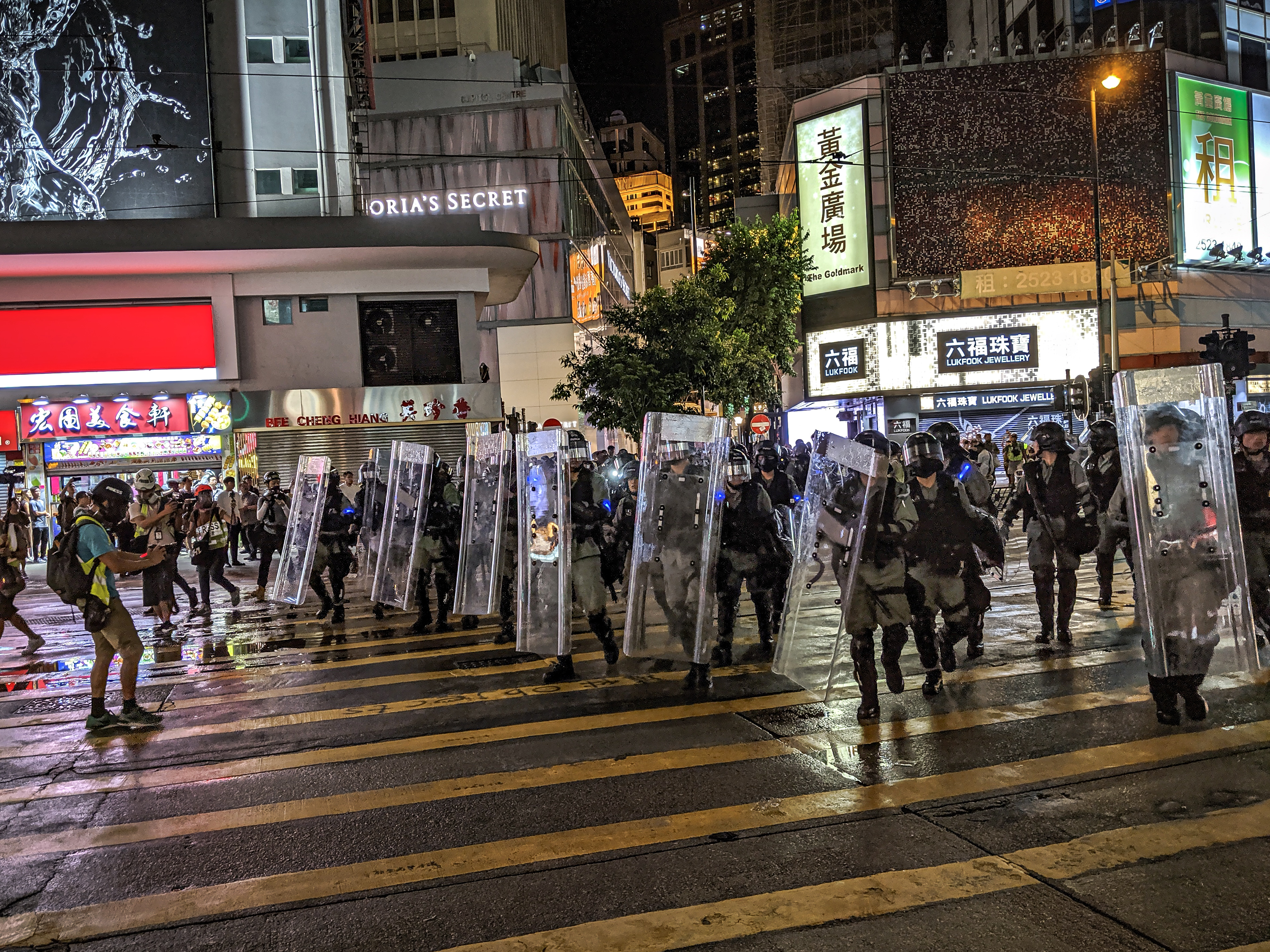
Riot police in the streets at night

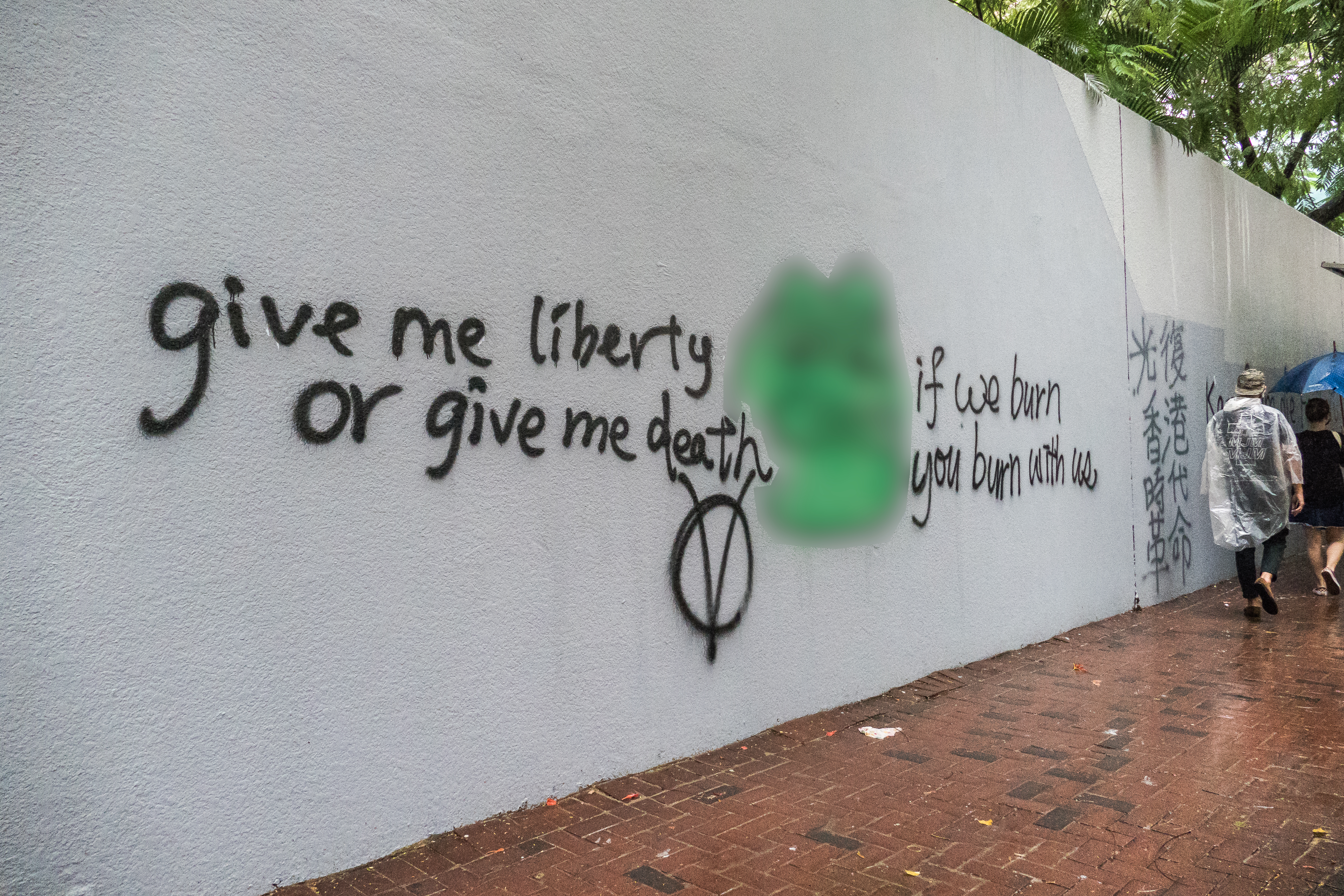
Graffiti on the wall with Pepe the Frog, a symbol of the protest.

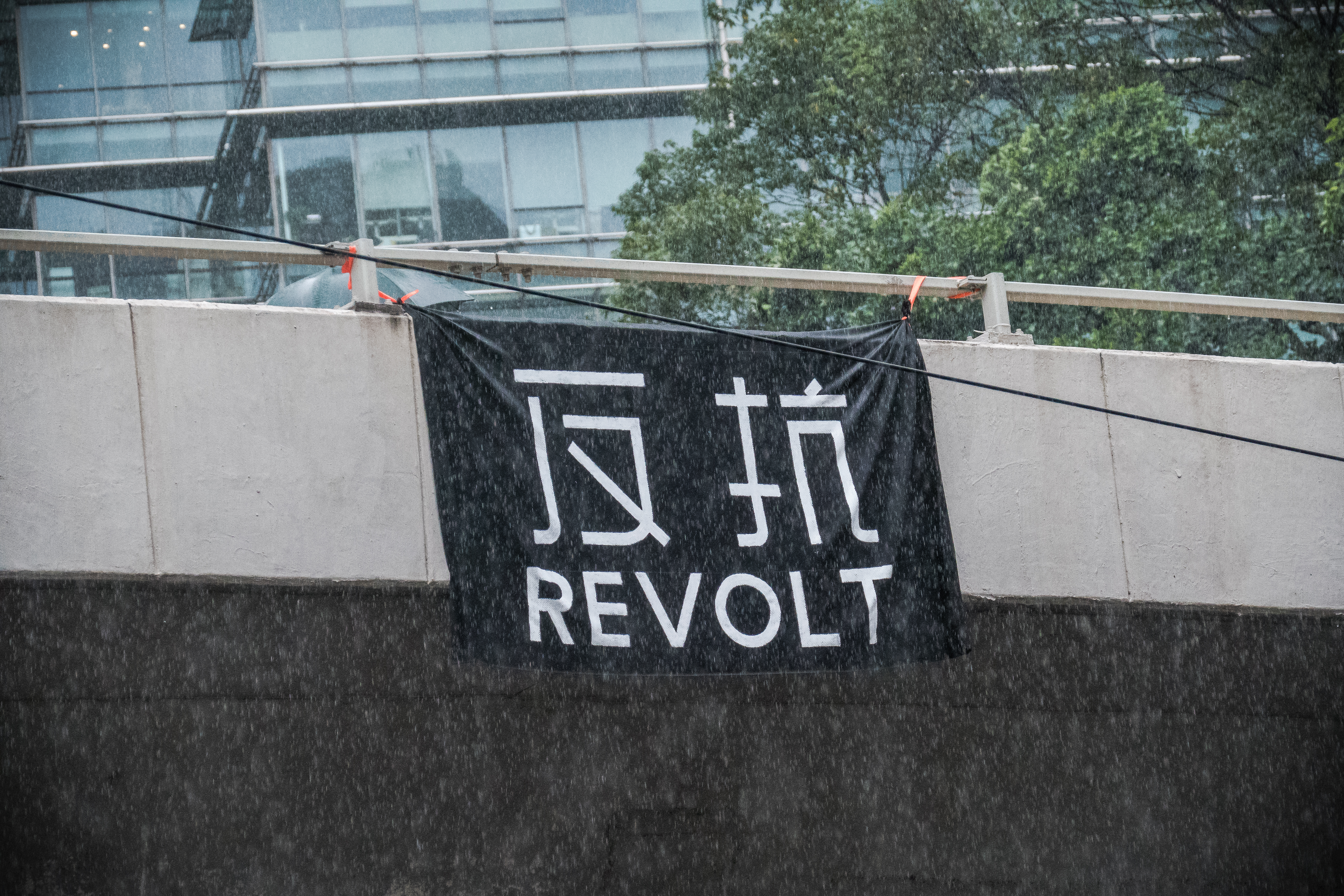
"Revolt" banner hung on a bridge

=== 8 October Ma On Shan incident ===
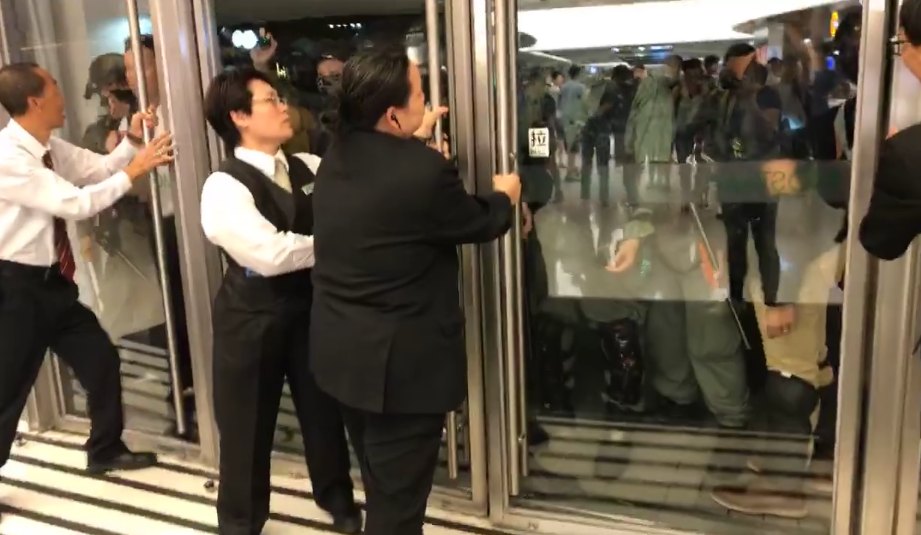
Police forced their way into MOSTown on 8 October. The security guards were later charged by the police for obstruction.

On 8 October, protesters gathered inside the shopping mall MOSTown to sing several protest songs such as "Glory to Hong Kong". However, after some protesters vandalised the Ma On Shan station, a group of riot police stormed the plaza. A group of security guards attempted to guard the door to prevent their entry as the mall is a private area. During the storming, a reporter from Stand News who was live streaming was attacked by the police, who pepper-sprayed her, removed her glasses and took her charging cable. Disgruntled protesters later briefly protested outside Ma On Shan police station.

Around the same time, protesters continued to confront with the police in various locations including Whampoa Garden, Mong Kok near Prince Edward station, Tai Po, and Tseung Kwan O, where a bicycle was thrown to a police officer who suffered injuries and was hospitalised.

=== 9 October solidarity rally for Edward Leung ===
Hundreds of supporters of jailed pro-independence activist Edward Leung gathered outside Hong Kong's Court of Appeal and queued as early as sunrise to get a seat in the public gallery. Leung was jailed due to his involvement in the 2016 Mong Kok civil unrest and had launched an appeal against his six-year prison sentence. Supporters chanted the slogan "liberate Hong Kong, the revolution of our times", which was Leung's campaign slogan during the 2016 New Territories East by-election.

=== 10 October march ===
Dozens of people held a protest outside the Tsim Sha Tsui police station to mark World Sight Day by showing their support for a woman who suffered a serious eye injury during an anti-government protest on 11 August. Protesters – many of them wearing masks in defiance of a new ban implemented last Saturday – chanted protest slogans and held up signs saying ‘five demands, not one less.’

On the other hand, a pair of black vertical protest banners, a couplet, was hung at the main entrance of Hong Kong University accusing the university officials for not speaking up against police brutality, and for not defending Hong Kong freedom. The couplet should read from right to left: "Watching From The Sideline You Ruin Hong Kong's Future. Turning a Blind Eye You Consent to Tyranny's Murders" (「你冷眼旁觀親手斷送香港未來」 「你視而不見淪為殺人政權幫兇」).

=== 12 October march ===
Over a thousand protesters marched in an unauthorised protest from Tsim Sha Tsui to Sham Shui Po to protest against the government's decision to invoke the emergency law. Protesters wore face masks in defiance of the anti-mask law. The march was largely peaceful with little police presence.

=== 13 October citywide conflicts ===
Protesters confronted with the police after flashmobs of protesters showed up in various districts in Hong Kong including Mong Kok, Tseung Kwan O, Tsuen Wan, Kowloon Bay, Sha Tin and Tai Po. The flashmob strategy was used to avoid arrest as railway operator MTR Corporation was accused of cooperating with the police to arrest protesters. Protesters continued to vandalise MTR stations, and sprayed graffiti on Chinese companies and pro-Beijing corporations. The police deployed tear gas to disperse the protesters in various districts.

In Kwun Tong, a protester slashed the neck of a police sergeant from behind with a box cutter. The officer, at the time, was handling a criminal damage case at Kwun Tong MTR station. He suffered a 5 cm deep neck wound that severed a jugular vein and vocal cord from the protester's attack. He was transported to United Christian Hospital in serious condition. Two people were arrested at the scene, including the suspected assailant. The suspect, an 18-year-old student, was later charged with wounding a uniformed police officer with intent to cause grievous bodily harm, which carries the maximum sentence of life imprisonment. The injured officer continued to be doxed after the attack, with the senior public prosecutor Vincent Lee Ting-wai disclosing that the prosecution would apply for a gag order to ensure the injured officer's anonymity out of safety concerns.

A homemade remote-controlled bomb was detonated, as told by the police, with the intention to kill or harm police officers. The explosion was set off near police officers who were clearing a roadblock built by protesters at the intersection between Fife Street and Nathan Road in Mong Kok. There were no casualties reported.

On 10 October 2023, five protesters were jailed for between 10 and 37 months. They were ruled to have been participating, along with about 30 others, in the false imprisonment of a plainclothes police officer in Tseung Kwan O; during the two minutes he was held, which were ruled by the judge to be a non-premeditated riot, the police officer had sustained head and limb wounds from being kicked and hit with hard objects. The charges had related to false imprisonment, participating in an unlawful assembly, rioting, breaching a mask ban, and wounding. A sixth defendant, a minor, was to be sentenced after the ruling in another case.

=== 14 October marches ===
==== 14 October protest at Hong Kong Design Institute ====
Chan Yin-lam, an avid swimmer and a protester, was declared dead in late September after her corpse was found floating naked in the sea near Yau Tong. Police claimed that after investigations, there had been nothing suspicious about the circumstances of Chan's death, which they considered to be a suicide, though many refused to trust the police. Students from Youth College and Hong Kong Design Institute (HKDI) Tiu King Leng campus gathered to demand the campus management to release the CCTV footage on the evening of 19 September, where Chan was last seen before her death. Campus management only released partial footage, causing disgruntled students to vandalise the glass panels of the campus.

The Vocational Training Council later released additional CCTV clips after 200 students, amid class suspension, rallied inside the campus to support an online appeal for an indefinite class boycott. However, in a new development to clarify the death, the mother of the student believed her daughter committed suicide.

==== 14 October rally for the Human Rights and Democracy Act ====
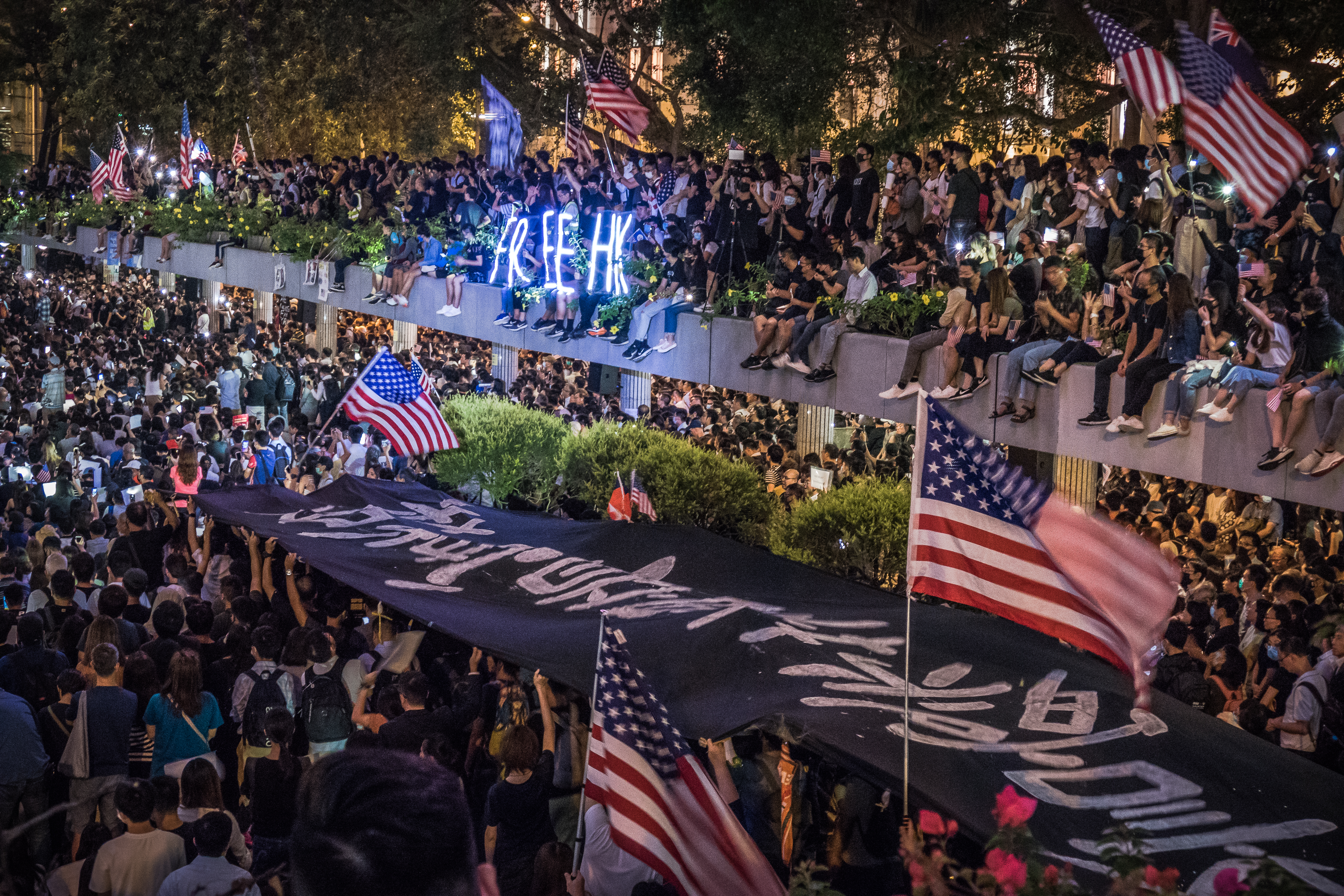
Protesters gathered in Chater Garden, waving the American flag, and "Free HK" banners.

A rally, using the slogan "Fight with Hong Kong, justice to our victims," was held at night on 14 October at Chater Garden, calling on the United States to pass the Hong Kong Human Rights and Democracy Act of 2019, which would sanction officials for undermining autonomy in Hong Kong. Organiser Ventus Lau received a Letter of No Objection from the police, making this the first protest with police approval since the emergency law was invoked. The rally began at 7 pm. Crowds split from the public park and onto adjacent roads, turned on their phone flashlights, and chanted protest slogans, such as "Hongkongers, resist" as they marched along with a massive vertical protest banner. The crowd sang protest songs including "Glory to Hong Kong". The event saw speeches from several figures including activist Joshua Wong and politician Au Nok-hin. Organisers announced that more than 130,000 people took part in the rally. The government issued a statement saying that it regretted the assembly and criticised any foreign interference into the "internal affairs" of Hong Kong.

=== 15 October basketball march ===
Dozens of basketball fans took to Southorn Playground in Wan Chai to show their support for Daryl Morey and expressed their sometimes racist disdain for superstar LeBron James, after both had stirred up controversy with their comments about the protests.

=== 18 October human chain ===
During the night of 18 October, protesters organised a human chain protest against the anti-mask law. Some protesters distributed masks to other participants, while some chanted slogans such as "five demands, not one less". Many protesters wore surgical masks to conceal their identity, though some also donned photographic masks of Carrie Lam, Xi Jinping, Winnie the Pooh and Guy Fawkes.

=== 20 October Kowloon protest ===
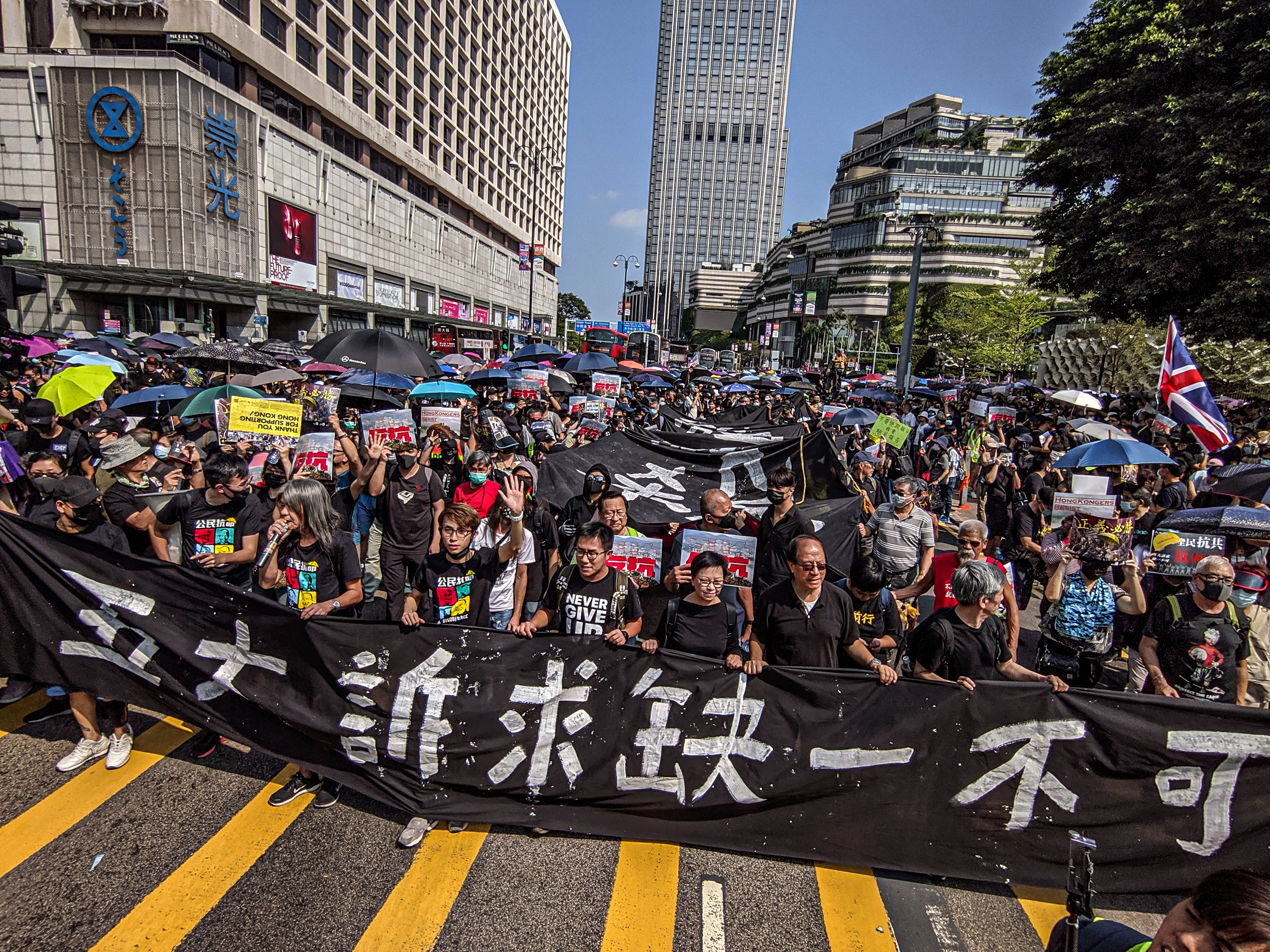
In the head of the parade, Salisbury road, Tsim Sha Tsui, Civil Human Rights Front and several pro-democratic individuals were holding a banner saying 'Five Demands, Not One Less'.

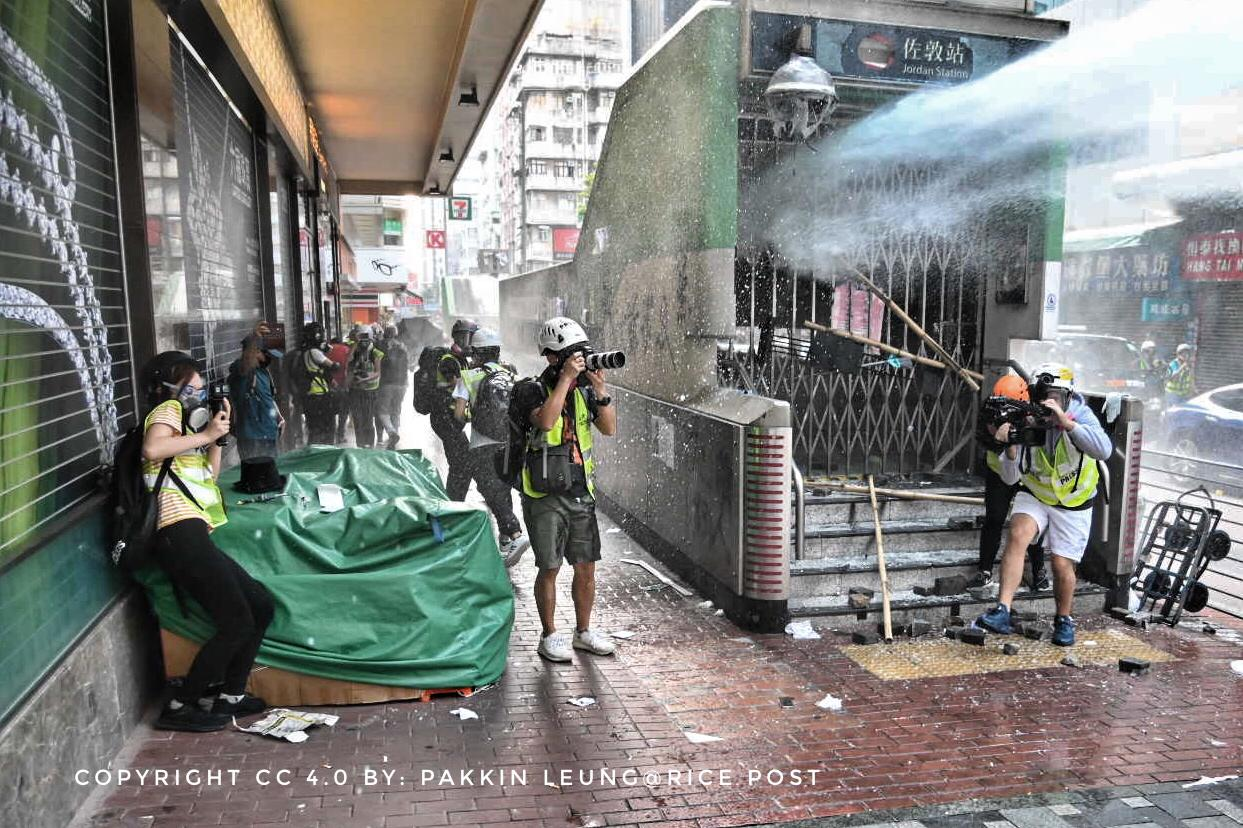
Water cannon cars fired Water cannons to the journalists' direction.

Following a police ban on a protest applied by the Civil Human Rights Front and the attack on CHRF convenor Jimmy Sham, protesters marched from Tsim Sha Tsui to the West Kowloon station to protest against the government's decision to invoke the emergency law and condemn police brutality. The peaceful protest was led by Figo Chan, the vice-convener of CHRF alongside former lawmakers including Albert Ho and Leung Kwok-hung, though some protesters splintered off to Nathan Road and it soon escalated into confrontations between the protesters and the police. The protesters continued to target MTR stations, Mainland Chinese-funded stores and Best Mart 360, which was accused of having ties to Fujianese triads, and hurled objects and petrol bombs at the police, whereas the police fired numerous tear gas canisters and deployed water cannon trucks. The conflict soon spread to other districts including Mong Kok and Sham Shui Po. Chan claimed that 350,000 people joined the march.

After Sham was attacked by a group of suspected South Asians, pro-protest members of ethnic minorities showed their solidarity with the protesters by distributing cold water to them at the entrance of Chungking Mansions, while some local protesters guarded the Kowloon Masjid and Islamic Centre, demanding passers-by not to vandalise the mosque out of retaliation. Before the protest, Sham had issued a statement, saying "Let us connect with and protect each other. Do not label anyone by ethnicity in the movement. I believe that everyone who joins this path to democracy are our brothers and sisters, regardless of nationality, language, color and race".

However, the police's clearance action, which saw blue-dyed water being sprayed on the gates of the mosque, led to condemnation from CHRF and the Muslim community in Hong Kong. Volunteers arrived an hour later to help clean the gate, while the police issued a statement saying that the mosque had not been its intended target and apologised to the mosque. Carrie Lam later followed up with an official apology. Former Indian Association of Hong Kong president Mohan Chugani, who was sprayed outside the mosque alongside lawmaker Jeremy Tam and businessman Phillip Khan, refused to accept Lam's apology, while Khan believed that the police intentionally sprayed the mosque and that the act was an "insult to the Islamic religion".

=== 21 October vertical protest banner on Devil's Peak ===
After making its rounds inside various shopping malls in Hong Kong, this 20-meter yellow vertical protest banner has now made its way to Devil's Peak. The words demanded "We Long for Glory To Hong Kong" (「我願榮光歸香港」).

=== 24 October solidarity rally for the Catalan protests ===
The rally was initiated by Chow Shue Fung, the former president of the Chinese University of Hong Kong Student Union, and Ventus Lau to support the protesters in the 2019 Catalan protests. The organisers said that the number of gatherings exceeded 3,000 people. Hong Kong protests have been cited as an inspiration by the Catalan protesters for its "leaderless" model. A solidarity rally for the Hong Kong protests was held outside the Chinese Consulate-General in Barcelona on the same day.

=== 25 October human chain ===
Hundreds of people formed a human chain in Tseung Kwan O saying they still believe the death of a 15-year-old student in the area is suspicious. Hong Kong Design Institute student Chan Yin-lam was last seen on the school's campus in Tiu Keng Leng on 19 September. Her body was found in the sea off Tseung Kwan O three days later.

=== 26 October rally by medical professionals ===
A peaceful rally of hundreds of medical professionals was conducted in a park in central Hong Kong. They protested against alleged violence employed by police against protesters, and also police arresting medical professionals working on the front-lines of the protests.

=== 27 October Tsim Sha Tsui protest ===
An unauthorised protest was conducted in the afternoon near the Peninsula luxury hotel. Police were already present, and within minutes of the start of the protest, tear gas and pepper spray was employed as the protesters fought with police. This led to people in the Peninsula hotel lobby being affected by the tear gas. At night, police travelled northwards from Tsim Sha Tsui, employing tear gas and water cannons (but without stinging blue dyed water used the previous week).

A hill-top vertical protest banner with the words "Hong Kong Police Intended Murder" (「香港警察蓄意謀殺」) written in Chinese used in earlier protests made its way to its final destination: Beacon Hill, where it was then retrieved by firefighters within hours.

=== 28 October Tuen Mun protest ===
Many Tuen Mun residents reported an unknown irritating smell, suspected to be tear gas, starting from 4 pm. Smells that resembled that of tear gas were reported near Kin Sang Estate and Shek Pai stop; some people who felt unwell were sent to hospital. Initially, firefighters suspected the smell to be the result of a chlorine leakage from Tuen Mun North West Swimming Pool, though staff at the swimming pool reported no gas leakage. It was later reported that the gas was leaked from Tai Hing Operational Base opposite Kin Sang Estate, though police denied that they had released any gas. In a joint statement, 10 District Council candidates from Tuen Mun condemned police for "neglecting the safety of local residents and testing tear gas near residential areas", requesting police to explain details of the situation and apologise to Tuen Mun residents. Roy Kwong, a Democratic member of the Legislative Council, said he had sent a letter to the Hong Kong Police Force requesting Commissioner of Police Stephen Lo to explain whether police leaked tear gas or related gases, suspecting that in such a case the health of local residents and animals would be adversely affected.

Several hundred people gathered at the Tai Hing Operational Base at night, in response to the irritating smell. Riot police were sent out to confront the crowd. Some protesters chanted slogans and pointed laser pens at officers, whilst police shone bright lights at the protesters. Protesters set up a makeshift roadblock on a street outside the base, threw bricks and a petrol bomb at a Bank of China branch, and damaged the glass door of a Fulum Group restaurant suspected to be sympathetic to gangs which have attacked them. Police responded with tear gas canisters after warning, some of which was fired onto the podium of Blossom Garden, a private housing estate nearby, and some to the seventh floor of Yat Sang House, Siu Hin Court.

=== 30 October Tuen Mun protest ===
A second protest in response to the suspected tear gas leak occurred at night. More than 70 people, mostly Tuen Mun residents, were arrested. Man Shek Fong-yau, a former police constable who organised several pro-Beijing events, appeared outside the Tai Hing Operational Base at 8:30 pm with around 30 people. The group chanted the slogan "Hong Kong cockroaches, the vermin of the times", a play on the pro-democracy slogan "Liberate Hong Kong, the revolution of our times", and was seen arguing with residents. Residents refused to leave after police raised a blue warning flag stating that they were engaged in an unlawful assembly. Several black-clad protesters began to form roadblocks 20 minutes later.

Police ordered residents to kneel down with their hands in the air or behind their backs at the lobby of Yat Sang House, Siu Hin Court. A man and a woman who appeared to taunt the police entered a Japanese restaurant in the area when officers tried to chase them. Two of the restaurant's shopkeepers refused to allow the police to enter the restaurant to arrest the pair. The police then pulled the shopkeepers out of the restaurant and arrested them, then ordered the original suspects to show their identification documents. At around midnight, protesters hurled petrol bombs at the police base, and the police responded by firing three bean bag rounds from inside the base.
