= Kin Sang (constituency) =

Hong Kong constituency

- 建生
- Elected constituency for the Tuen Mun District Council
- Boundary of Kin Sang in Tuen Mun District
- District: Tuen Mun
- Legislative Council constituency: New Territories North West
- Population: 16,698 (2019)
- Electorate: 10,874 (2019)

Current constituency
- Created: 1994
- Number of members: One
- Member: Vacant

Kin Sang (Chinese: 建生) is one of the 31 constituencies in the Tuen Mun District.

Created for the 1994 District Board elections, the constituency returns one district councillor to the Tuen Mun District Council, with an election every four years.

Kin Sang loosely covers areas surrounding Blossom Garden, Goodrich Garden, Kin Sang Estate, Siu Hin Court and Venice Gardens in Tuen Mun with an estimated population of 16,698.

== Councillors represented ==
Election	Member	Party
2019	Law Pei-lee→Vacant	TCHDNTW→Nonpartisan

== Election results ==
=== 2010s ===
Tuen Mun District Council Election, 2019: Kin Sang
Party	Candidate	Votes	%	±%
PfD (Team Chu)	Law Pei-lee	4,730	60.44	
DAB	Chan Man-wah	3,096	39.56	
Majority		1,634	20.88	
Turnout		7,856	72.28	
PfD gain from DAB		Swing		
