= Kin Sang Estate =

Public housing estate in Tuen Mun, Hong Kong

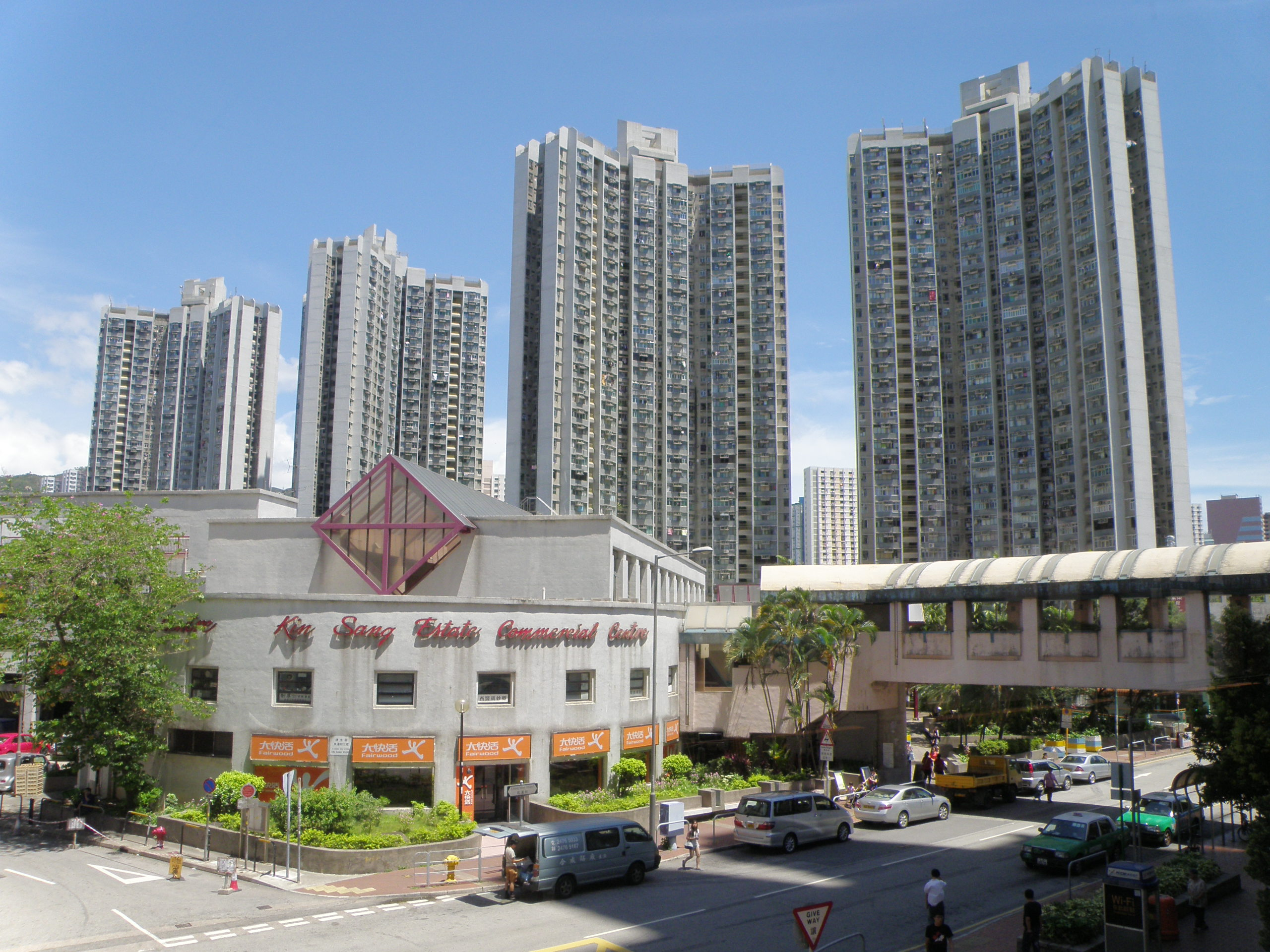
- Kin Sang Estate
- Interactive map of Kin Sang Estate

General information
- Location: 3 Leung Wan Street, Tuen Mun; New Territories, Hong Kong
- Coordinates: 22.405987°N 113.970383°E
- Status: Completed
- Category: Public rental housing
- Population: 10,804 (2016)
- No. of blocks: 4
- No. of units: 2,652

Construction
- Constructed: 1989; 37 years ago
- Authority: Hong Kong Housing Authority

Kin Sang Estate (Chinese: 建生邨) is a public housing estate in Tuen Mun, New Territories, Hong Kong. It is the eleventh public housing estate in Tuen Mun, located near Light Rail Kin Sang stop, Ching Chung Koon and Castle Peak Hospital. It consists of four residential buildings completed in 1989. In 1998, some of the flats were sold under Tenants Purchase Scheme Phase 1.

Siu Hin Court (Chinese: 兆軒苑) is a Home Ownership Scheme court in Tuen Mun, near Kin Sang Estate. It has two blocks built in 1991. The two blocks were originally planned for rental housing of Kin Sang Estate, but their flats were finally converted to HOS to be sold to public.

== Houses ==
=== Kin Sang Estate ===
Name	Chinese name	Building type	Completed
Hong Sang House	康生樓	Trident 4	1989
Lok Sang House	樂生樓	Trident 4	1989
Tai Sang House	泰生樓	Trident 4	1989
Yue Sang House	裕生樓	Trident 4	1989

=== Siu Hin Court ===
Name	Chinese name	Building type	Completed
Shun Sang House	順生閣	Trident 4	1991
Yat Sang House	逸生閣	Trident 4	1991

== Demographics ==
According to the 2016 by-census, Kin Sang Estate had a population of 7,876 while Siu Hin Court had a population of 2,928. Altogether the population amounts to 10,804.

== Politics ==
Kin Sang Estate and Siu Hin Court are located in Kin Sang constituency of the Tuen Mun District Council. It was formerly represented by Law Pei-lee, who was elected in the 2019 elections until July 2021.

== Education ==
Kin Sang Estate is in Primary One Admission (POA) School Net 70. Within the school net are multiple aided schools (operated independently but funded with government money) and the following government schools: Tuen Mun Government Primary School (屯門官立小學).

== See also ==
- Public housing estates in Tuen Mun
