= Vertical banner =

Type of Chinese signage

- 直幡; Part of Umbrella Movement
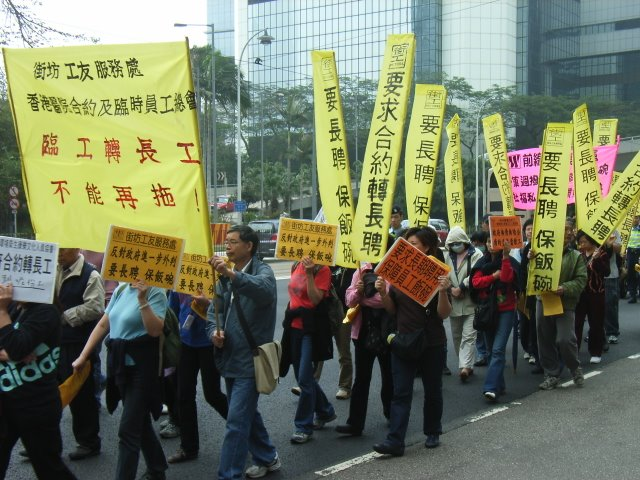
- Vertical banners used during a demonstration regarding workers rights in Hong Kong, 2007
- Date: 1967–present
- Location: Hong Kong
- Methods: Banner designed to display traditional Chinese characters

A vertical banner is a type of banner designed to accommodate traditional Chinese characters. They have become associated with acts of protest and civil disobedience in Hong Kong, particularly the Umbrella Movement. The written traditional Chinese for vertical banners are "直幡", whilst their horizontal counterpart are written as "横額".

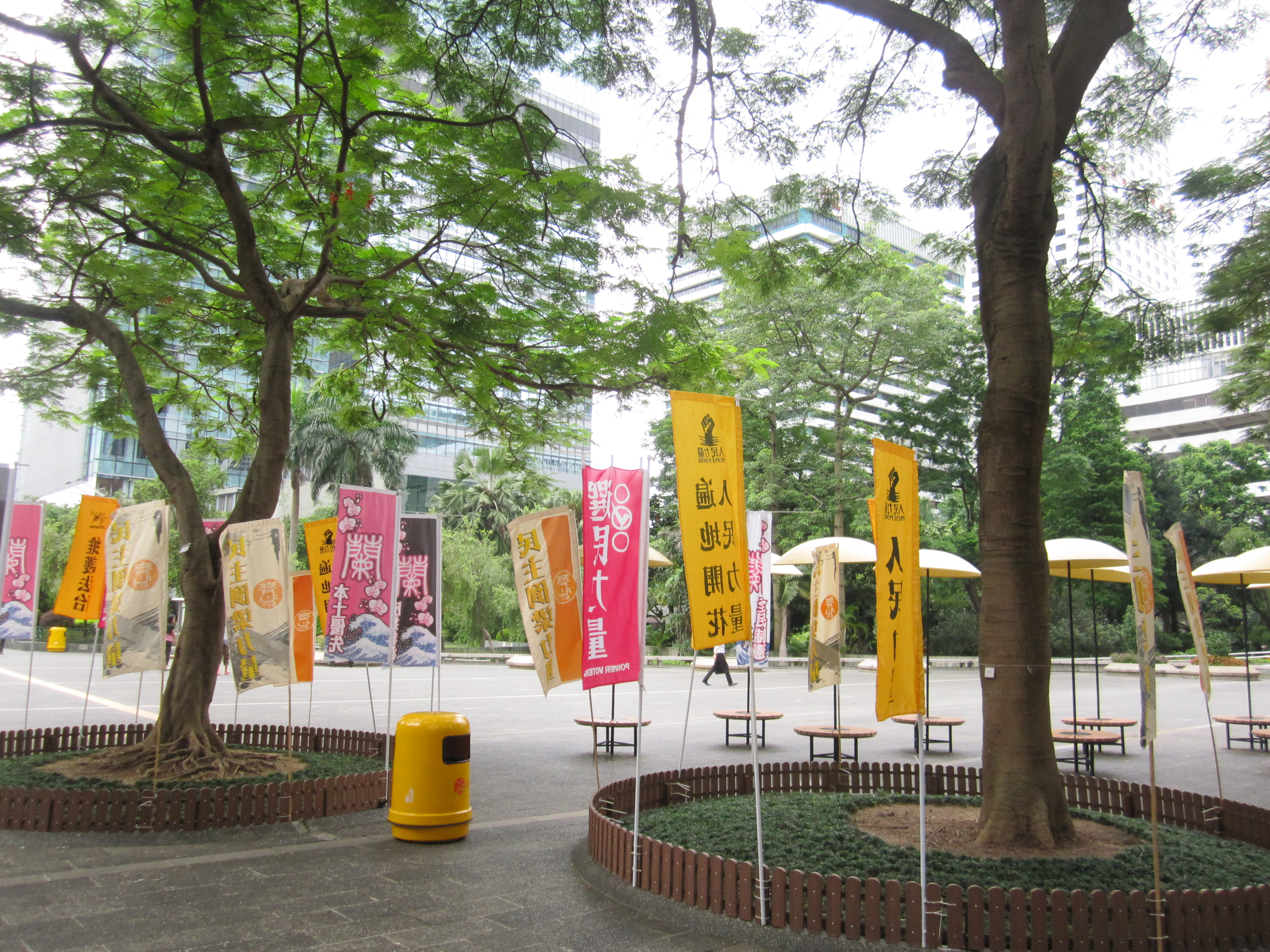
Small election campaign vertical banner seen in July 2013.

English-language banners are often horizontally written, but because Chinese characters are traditionally written vertically and are read from top to bottom, Chinese characters on banners are often vertically scripted. Normally, smaller vertical banners in Hong Kong are used as election campaign material or as advertisement tactic. One may also see them hung on street lamps as celebratory decoration occasionally.

== Use as protest banners ==
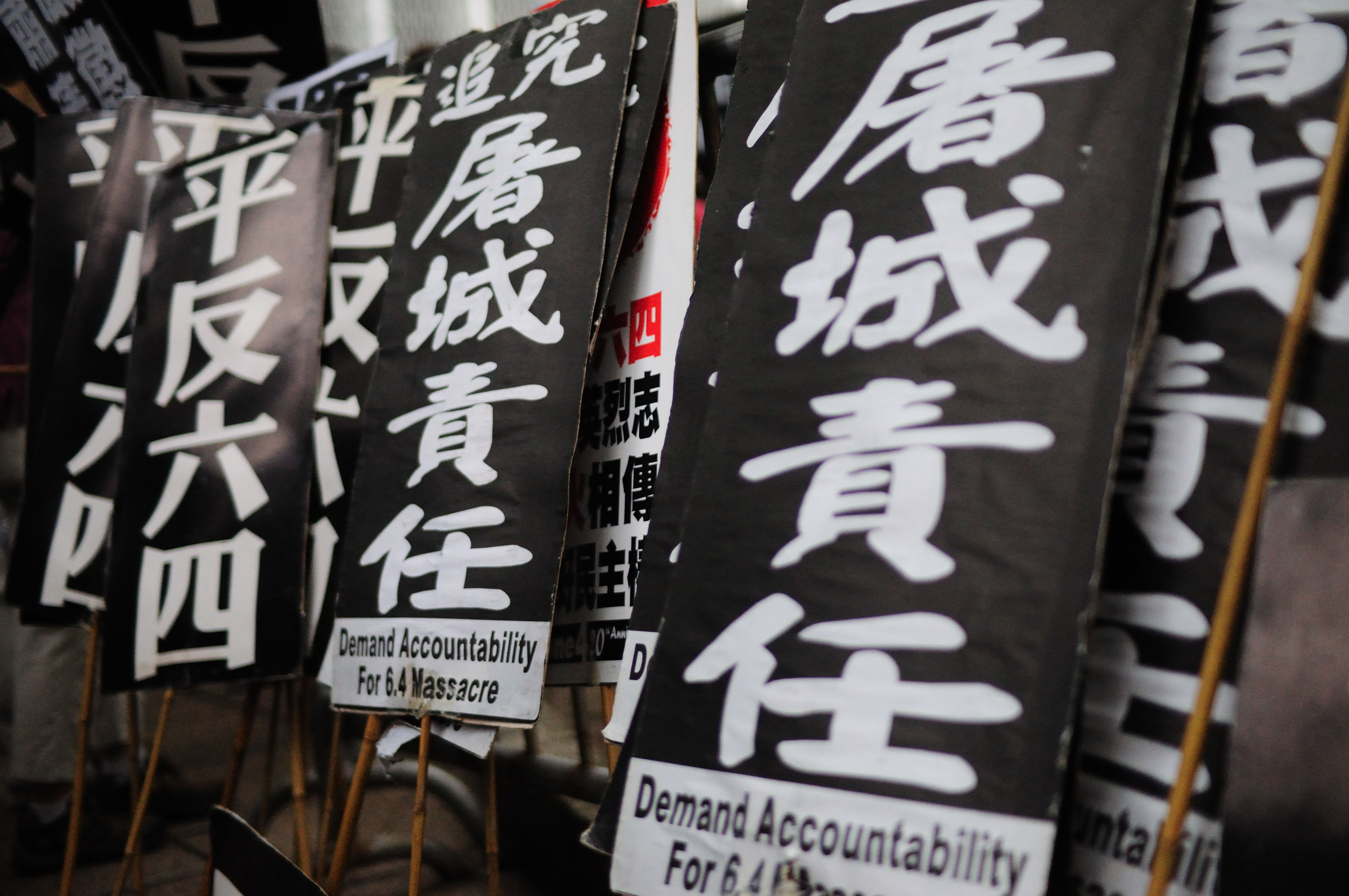
Smaller hand-held vertical protest banners on 2010 during the June 4th Massacre anniversary vigil. The banner stated "Hold Them Responsible For The Slaughter".

During mass protests and demonstrations dozens, and sometimes, hundreds, of Hong Kong protest marchers would hold up long banners horizontally so onlookers from high-rise buildings can see the words from above. In general, Cantonese characters and written Chinese are both used in these vertical protest banners. On the other hand, while most of these vertical protest banners were written in traditional Chinese characters, occasionally simplified Chinese, a product created by Communist China since the Cultural Revolution in 1949, are used in these protest banners for their negative connotations and cynical association with Communist China. In Hong Kong, with its native tongue being Cantonese and native written language being traditional Chinese characters, the controversy over traditional and simplified Chinese can be easily detected on these vertical protest banners.

While banners, large and small, vertical and horizontal, have been used throughout Hong Kong since as early as 1967, and most frequently during the annual 1989 Tiananmen Square protests and massacre march and vigil since 1989, it was the Umbrella Movement of 2014 marked the beginning of the uniquely Hong Kong hill-top vertical protest banners movement. A group of rock climbing activists decided to unfurl a 30-meter vertical protest banner on Lion Rock and document their descent on YouTube. At the time, even some Hong Kong citizens thought it was a joke. The yellow fabric echoed the iconic yellow helmet in the Umbrella Movement. Since then, many more hill-top banners have shown up throughout Hong Kong, and the messages to the government also become increasing harsh as Hong Kong authorities and Chinese government continue to crack down on dissents.

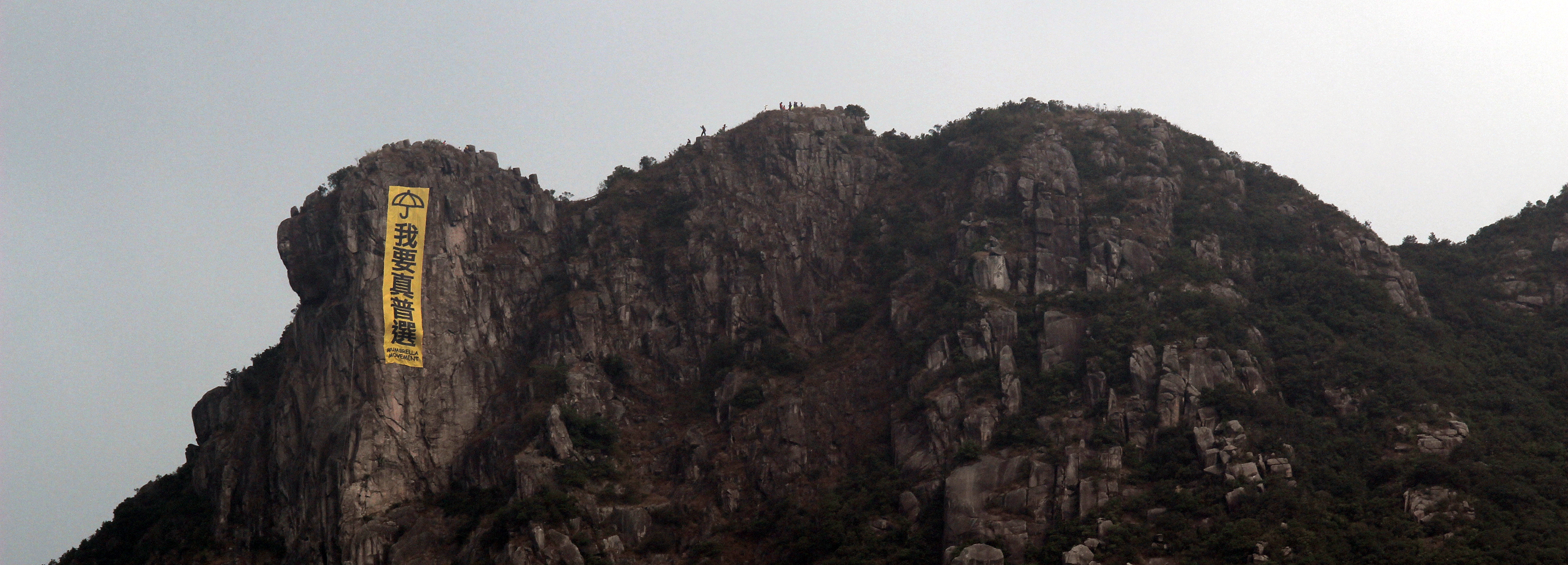
The defining moment of vertical protest banners in Hong Kong protest. The banner reads "We Demand Genuine Universal Suffrage". Picture taken on October 24, 2014.

The vertical protest banners documented below often showcase the Chinese character "我", which literally translates as "I". However, as Hong Kong citizens protest in solidarity in thousands and sometimes in millions, the banners will be translated into "we". All Chinese characters on the banners are written here exactly as is.

=== Prior to Umbrella Movement ===
==== 1989 Tiananmen Square protests and massacre ====
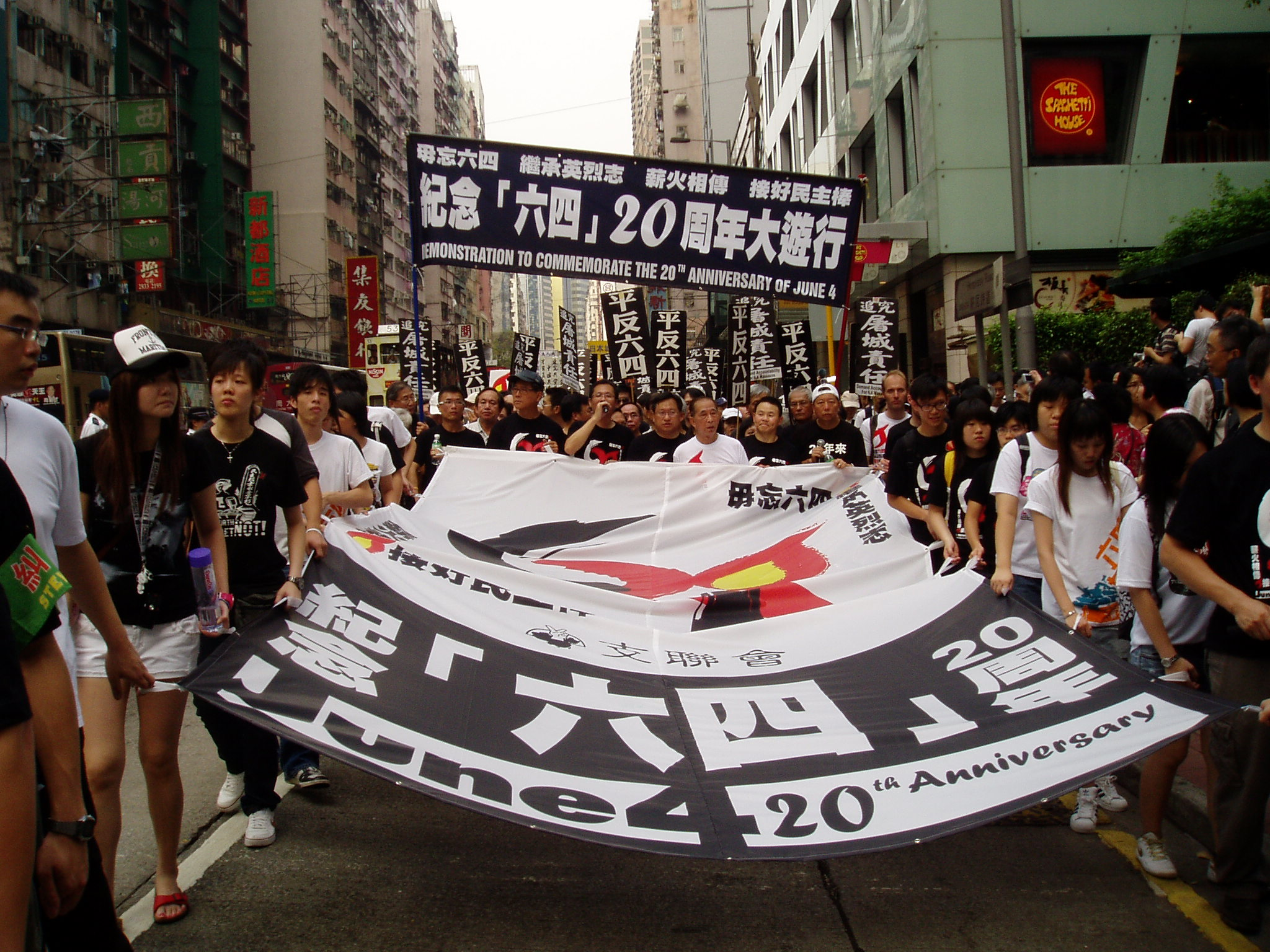
2009 march marked the 20th anniversary of the 1989 Tiananmen Square protests and massacre.

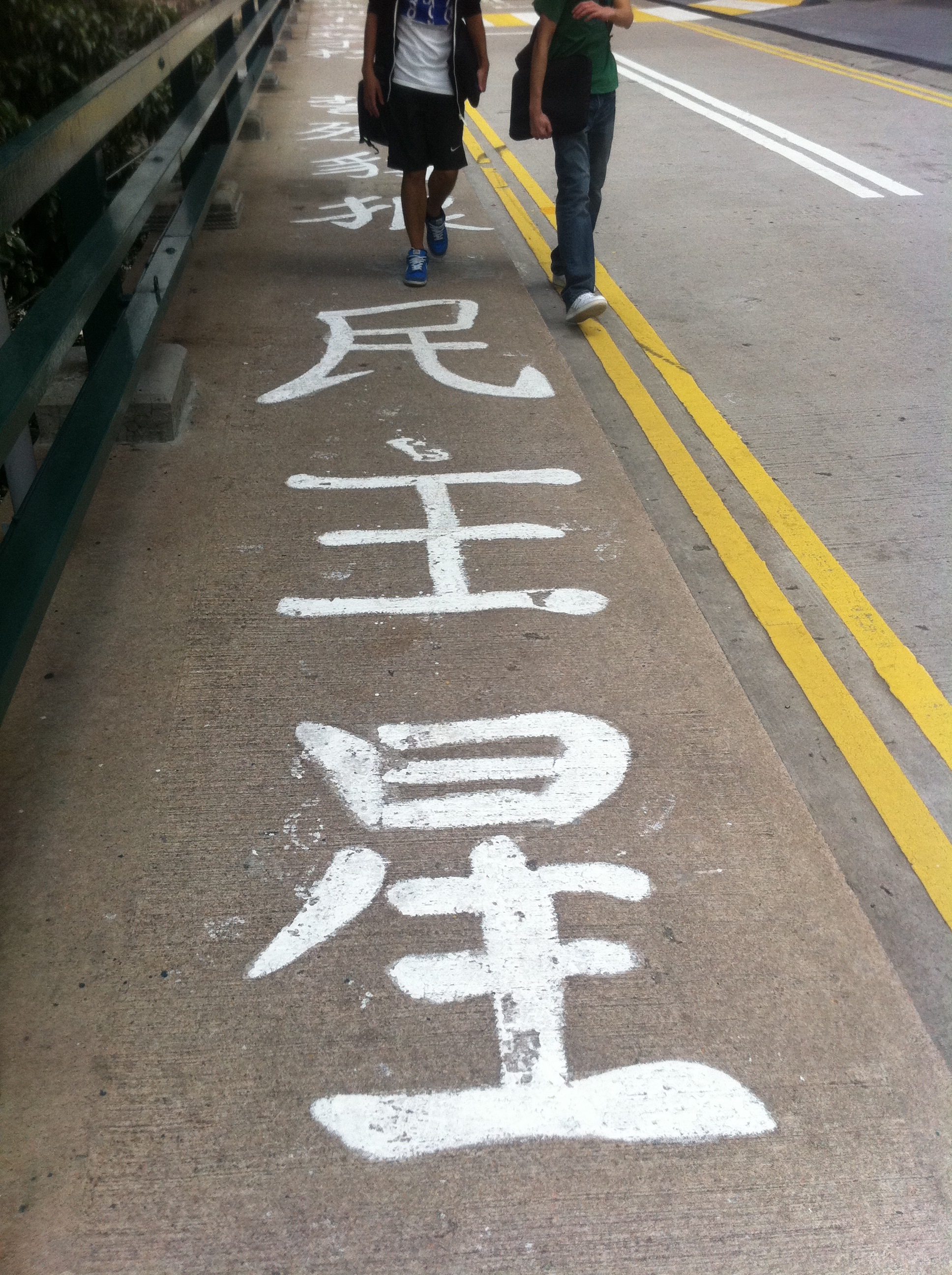
Originally a bridge-length vertical protest banner to commemorate those who died in the hands of Communist China, now the phrase is painted, and repainted, annually on June 4th, on the Tai Koo bridge of Hong Kong University.

On June 4, 1989, after the Tiananmen Square massacre took place, Hong Kong University students lay out a bridge-length black vertical protest banner and painted in white the phrase "Cold-Blooded Slaughters Will Not Kill Their Spirit; Vow to Revenge Democracy Never Dies"「冷血屠城烈士英魂不朽 誓殲豺狼民主星火不滅」to show support of democracy and to condemn the Chinese government. Although the black vertical protest banner was only hung for one day, the white paint that leaked through the fabric and left on the bridge become a piece of historic artifact of the banner's existence. Thereafter, annually, Hong Kong University students would repaint these twenty words directly on the bridge concrete. This is probably the first vertical pro-democracy protest banner in Hong Kong. As time passes, the June 4th commemoration vigil in Hong Kong would always be held at night in Victoria Park, since the massacre in 1989. The weekend before June 4, or if June 4 lands on a weekend, there would be a massive rally on the streets of Causeway Bay to demand accountability from the Chinese officials as authorities still denied to this date. The vertical protest banner shown here was from the 2009–20th anniversary—march, on which "Dare Not Forget June Fourth" (「毋忘六四」) and "Remember June Fourth 20th Anniversary" (「紀念六四20週年」). In 2020, Hong Kong authorities for the first time denied the vigil citing pandemic health concerns, and later arrested many for unlawful gathering.

==== 2007 Queen's Pier Preservation ====
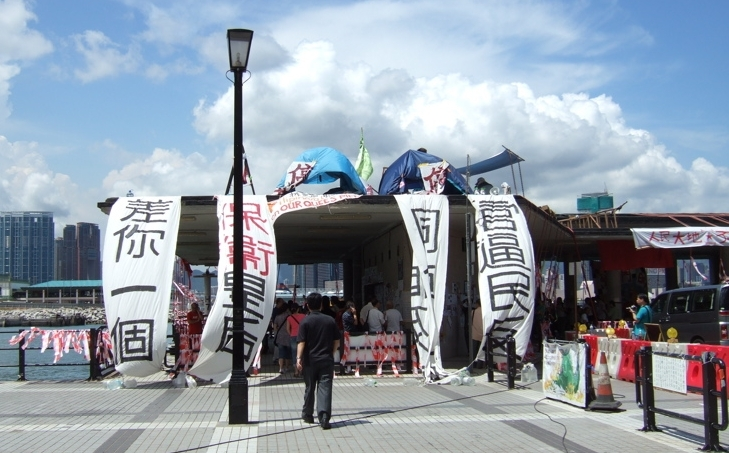
2007 vertical banners hung from the pier's rooftop.

Hundreds of protesters stayed around-the-clock to block the demolition of the British colonial relic Queen's Pier. White vertical banners were seen being hung from the roof of the pier as hunger strikes continued for days. The readings, from left to right, roughly translated as "Need One More of You", (「差你一個」), "Safeguard the Queen('s Pier)" (「保衛皇后」), "Fight To The Death" (「同佢死過」) and "Government Coerces Citizens Revolt" (「官逼民反」). This preservation campaign has been considered as the birth of Hong Kong's localist movement as younger Hong Kong citizens identified more as independent Hong Kongers.

==== 2007 Hong Kong Chinese University Graduation Ceremony ====
On December 6, 2007, a pair of red-fabric white font vertical protest banners were unfurled from the top floor of CUHK building to the ground. The purpose of the banner was to protest the then-Hong Kong chief executive officer Tung Chee-Wha awarded an honorary doctorate degree by Lawrence Lau, the principal of CUHK. 「董建華禍港殃民有博士 劉遵義求榮賣校無良知」roughly translates to "Tung Chee-Wha hurt Hong Kong so much but received a doctorate degree; Lawrence Lau sold out the school with no ethics".

==== 2014 Northeast New Territories Development Protest ====
The protest against government's lack of consultation with original inhabitants of the remote area and the lack of Hong Kong ecological and cultural preservation in this new housing development proposal drew ire to thousands of Hong Kong citizens. More over, the Legislative Council budget committee passed the budget proposal without following proper procedures. The two persons climbing to the top of a pedestrian bridge roof to hang four banners was opposition leader Cheung Kwai-choi and a social activist Chow Nok Hang. He unfurled four vertical protest banners lined by 50,000 signatures in red color from Hong Kong citizens opposing the development with black fonts. He was later fined a thousand HKD for disobeying executive orders, and may have been the first Hong Kong citizen fined by hanging vertical protest banners.

==== September 22, 2014 College Boycott ====
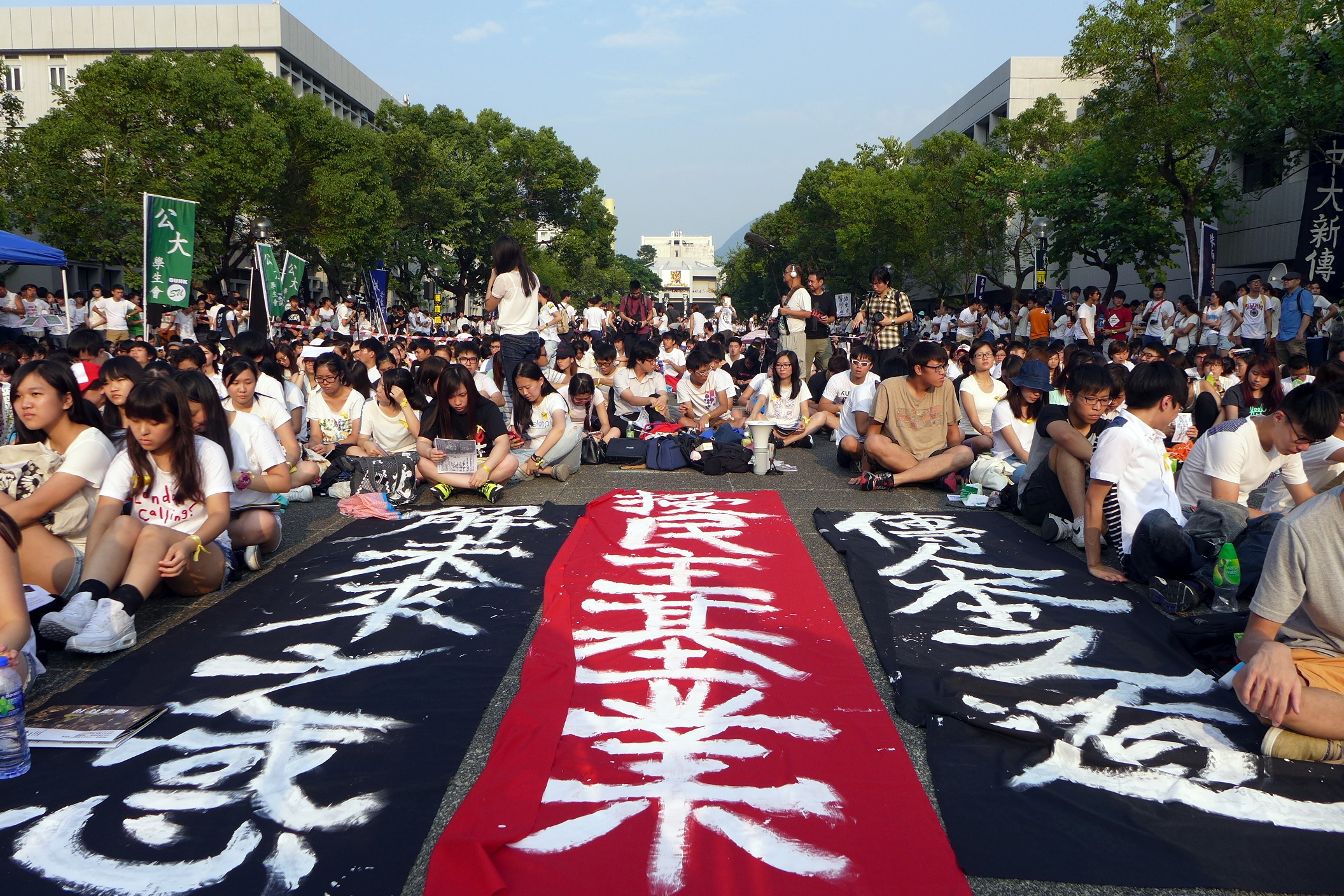
First higher education strike in Hong Kong on September 22, 2014, leading to the official beginning of the Umbrella Movement four days later.

Over 13,000 college students gathered in Hong Kong Chinese University (CUHK) on the first day of the Hong Kong class boycott campaign to demand universal suffrage and democracy in response to Beijing's denial on August 31. Other demands included increasing social inequality and increase government transparency and officials' accountability. The strike was supported by academic professors for a better Hong Kong and would later turn into the 2014 Umbrella Movement as Hong Kong government continued to ignore their demands. There were two black banners hung vertically in the main atrium of CUHK. They read "We Decide Our Fate Boycott Must Go On" (「抗命捉緊命運 罷課事在必行」). The three vertical banners seen on protest ground of CUHK were considered a literary triplet and should be read together. The two black and one red banners written in white paint should be read from right to left: "Future Uncertainties Can Be Solved By Humanity-Focused Democracy" (「傳人本之道」「授民主基業」「解末來之惑」).

=== 2014 Umbrella Movement ===
==== September–November, 2014 Harcourt Road, Admiralty ====
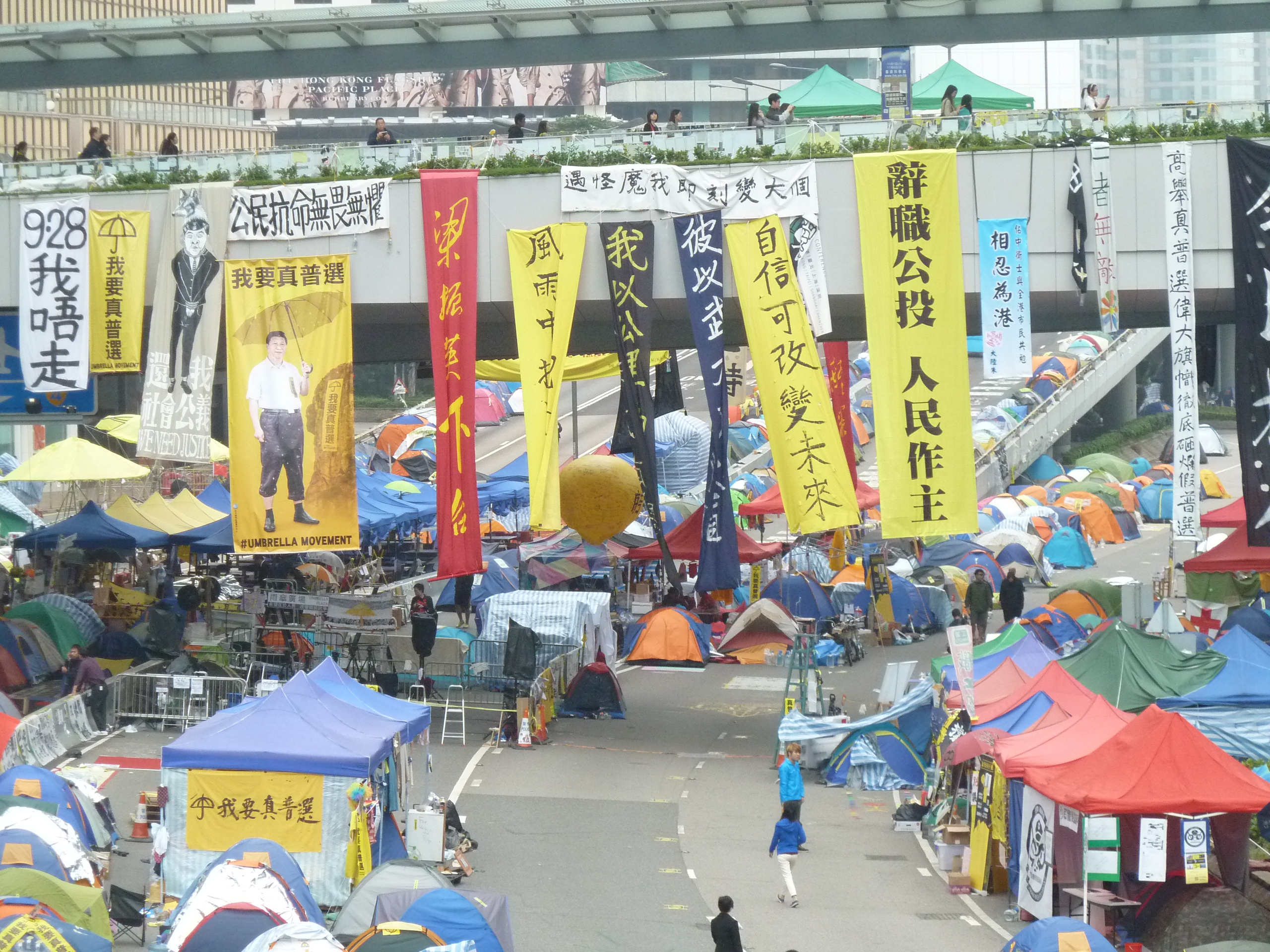
Vertical protest banners showing demands and inspirational phrases during the Umbrella Movement. 2014.

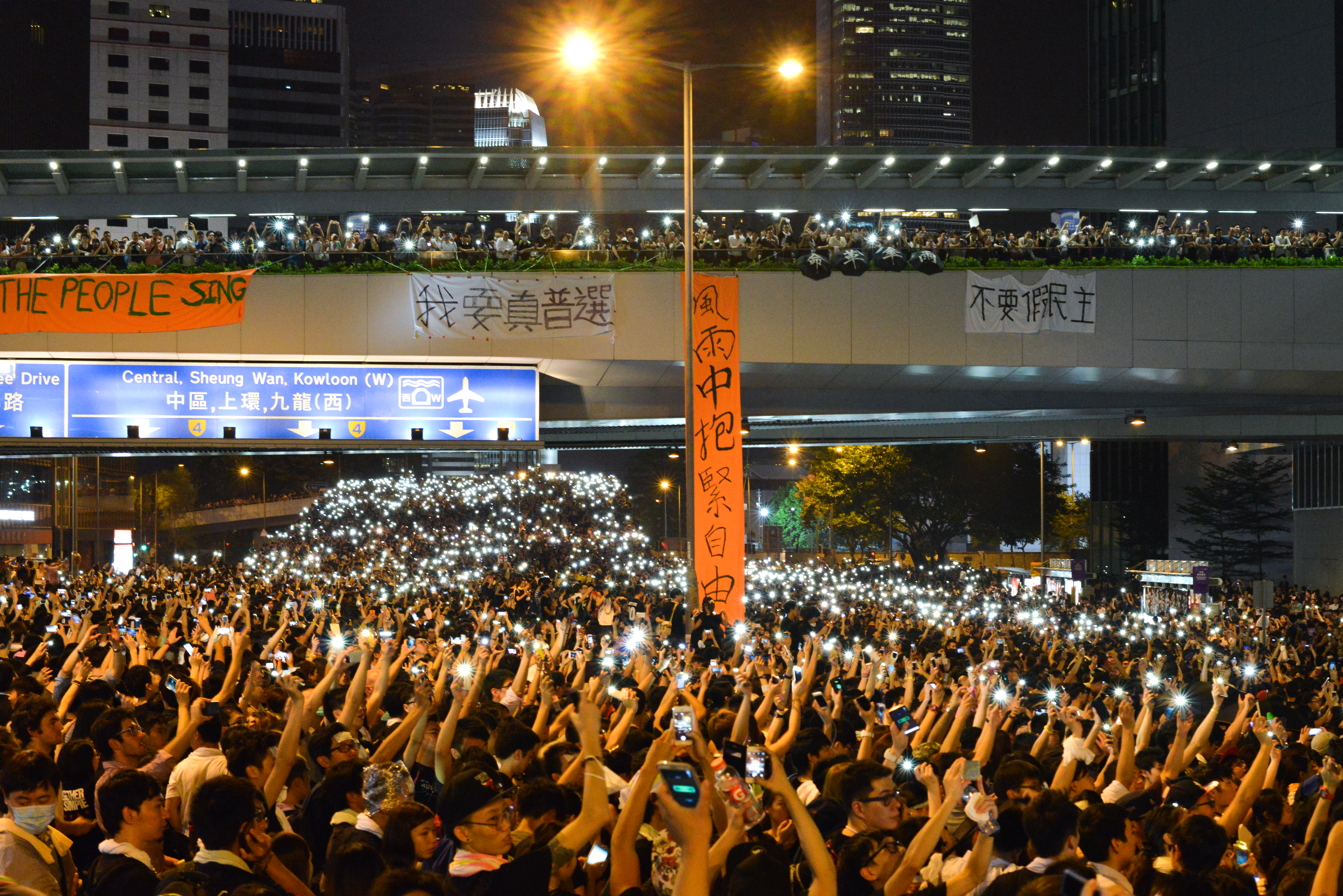
Popular song lyric on an orange vertical protest banner on September 30, 2014.

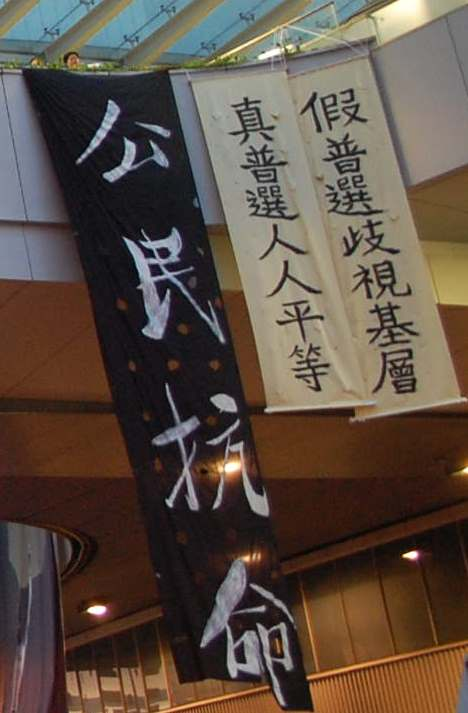
The black vertical protest banner read 'Citizens Resist", and the two white banners, as a couplet, from right to left, read "Fake Universal Suffrage Discriminate Against the Poor; Genuine Universal Suffrage Makes Everyone Equal". Photo date October 24, 2014.

Dissatisfaction toward both Hong Kong and China government led to a 79-day stand-off between ordinary citizens and high-power government officials. During the Umbrella Movement most of Admiralty has been closed off and many vertical banners were hung from the pedestrian bridges perpendicular to Harcourt Road. Merging art, music and politics together, some of these banners were inspirational song lyrics, such as "Embrace Freedom In the Midst of Storm" (「風雨中抱緊自由」) from Beyond's song 海闊天空 ("Boundless Oceans, Vast Skies"). Others were rhyming phrases and drawings showing protesters' demands.

==== October 22, 2014 Lion Rock ====
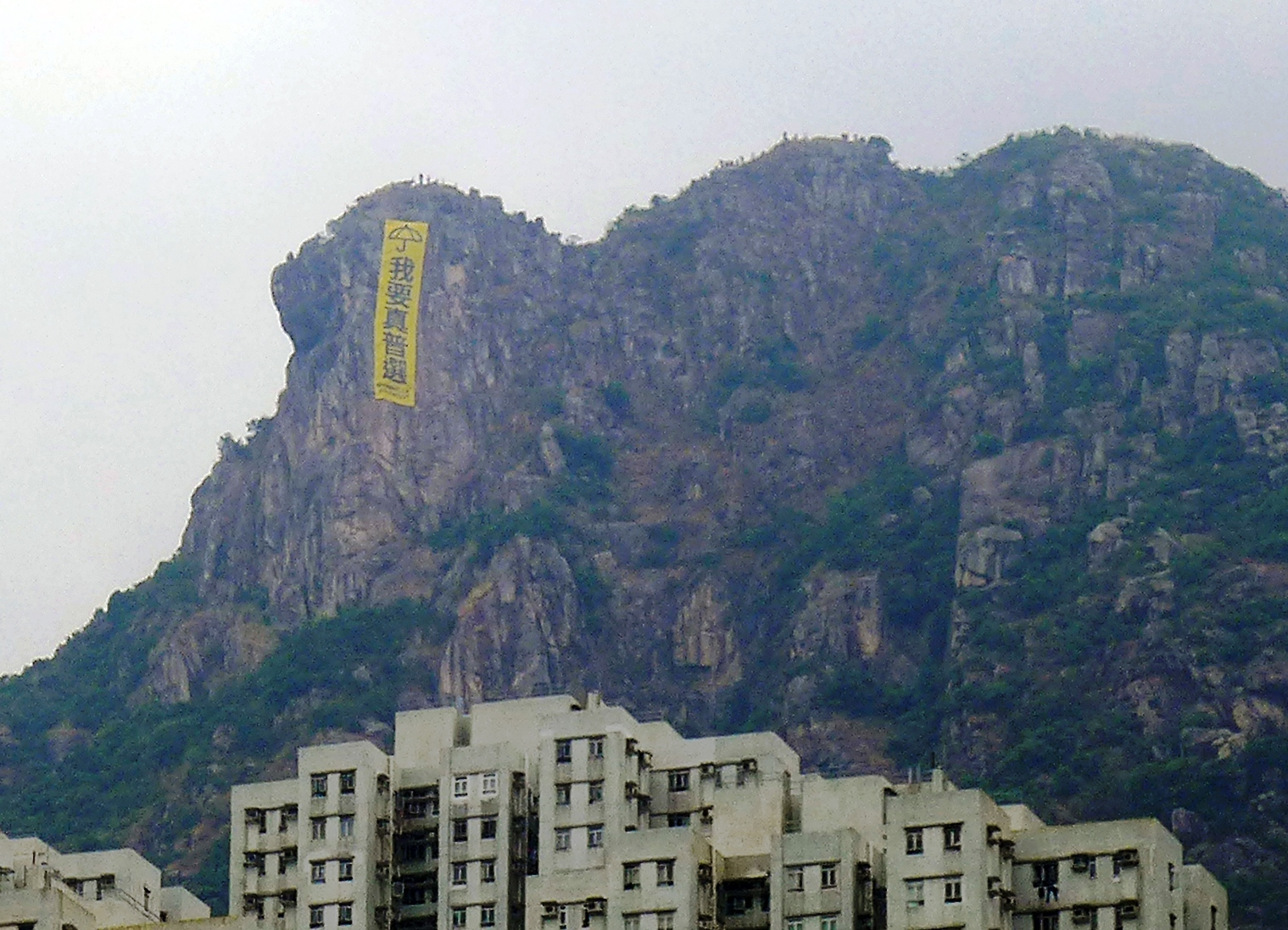
Hill-top banner appeared for the first time on Lion Rock in Hong Kong, October 23, 2014.

This event is now commonly considered as the first documented hillside banner hanging in Hong Kong. A local rock climbing group called "Hong Kong Spidie" claimed responsibility for hanging up the 28-meter yellow vertical banner that read "We Demand Genuine Universal Suffrage" (「我要真普選」) in black font with an umbrella symbol over Lion Rock. Andreas, the rock-climbing group's leader, would famously put on a Spider-Man costume when interviewed, claiming that the Spider-Man persona symbolized a normal teenager doing good deeds to better the society. The group released two videos on YouTube that morning: one was a manifesto video explaining Lion Rock as the climb site to show the Hong Kong Lion Rock Spirit. Another video was a behind-the-scene video capturing the climb preparation, the actual descent on the Rock, and the unfurling of the vertical protest banner.

==== October 27–28, 2014 Hong Kong University and Hong Kong Chinese University ====
The now-famous yellow vertical protest banner "We Demand Genuine Universal Suffrage #Umbrella Movement" (「我要真普選」) was found hanging inside Hong Kong University campus and outside a medical staff dormitory building of Prince Whales Hospital of Hong Kong Chinese University in Sha Tin.

==== November 1, 2014 Kowloon Peak and Tai Po ====
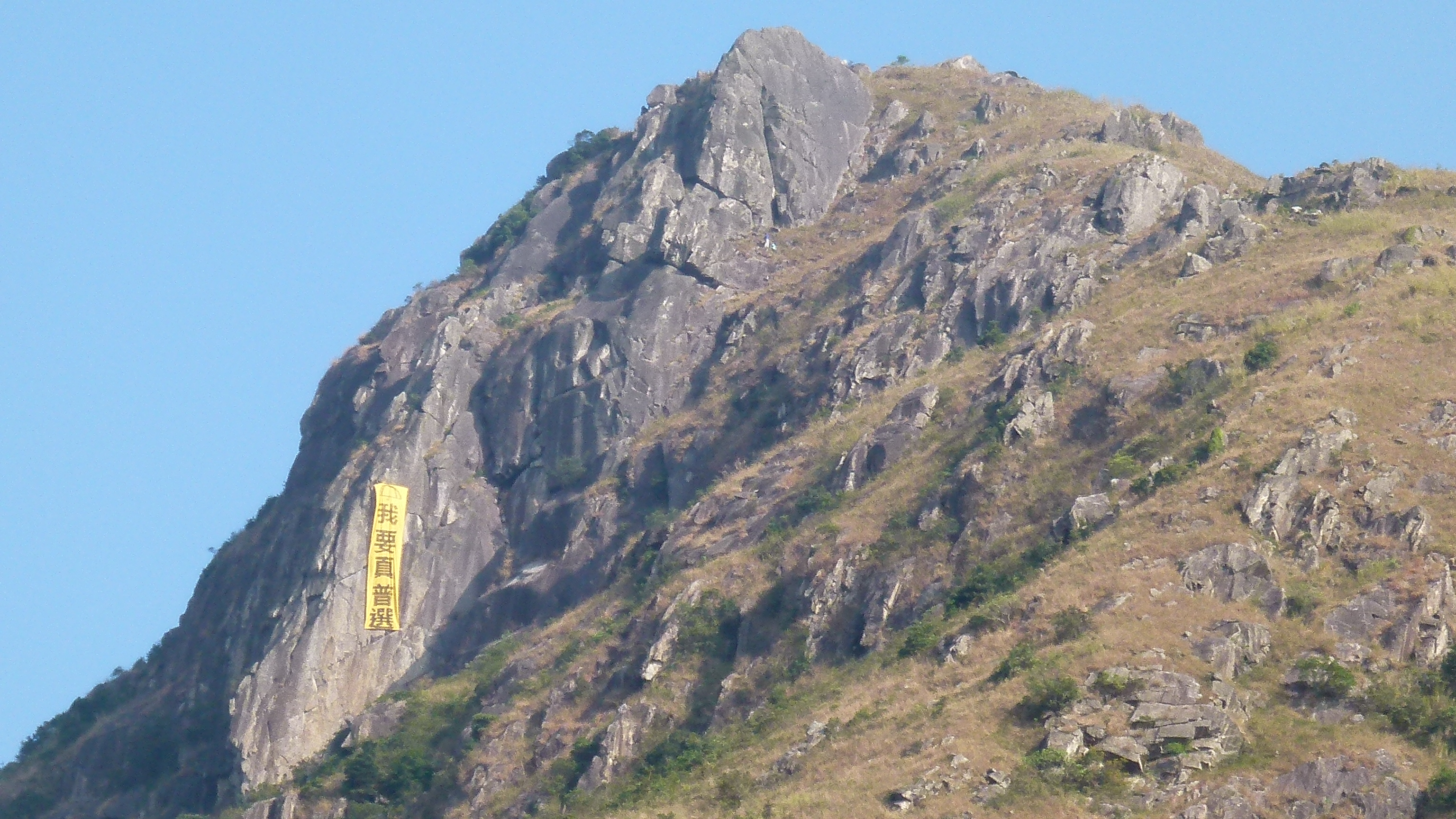
Another "We Demand Genuine Universal Suffrage" vertical protest banner found on Kowloon Peak on November 1, 2014.

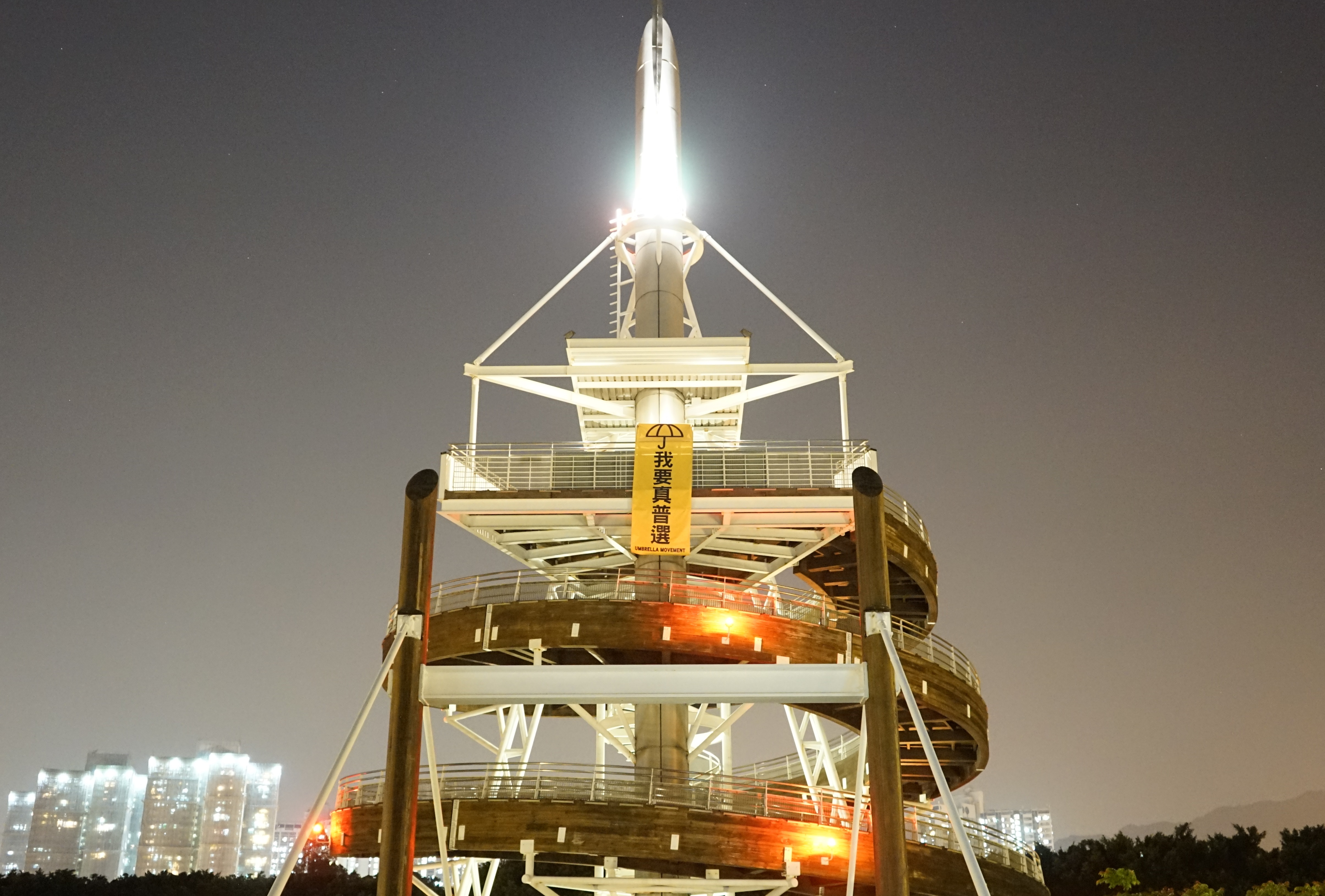
Tai Po has not been a protest hotspot in 2014. Picture taken on November 1, 2014.

Another familiar yellow-with-black-font "We Demand Genuine Universal Suffrage #Umbrella Movement" (「我要真普選」) banner was unfurled but this time at Kowloon Peak that is located next to Lion Rock. More identical banner showed up in Tai Po.

==== November 3, 2014 Next Media Headquarter in Tseung Kuan O ====
More happenings of the hanging of "We Demand Genuine Universal Suffrage #Umbrella Movement" (「我要真普選」) and this time the banner was located on the building of a pro-democracy print newspaper Apple Daily headquarter. The banner was funded by newspaper staff donation, according to news report.

==== December 9–11, 2014 Harcourt Road, Admiralty ====
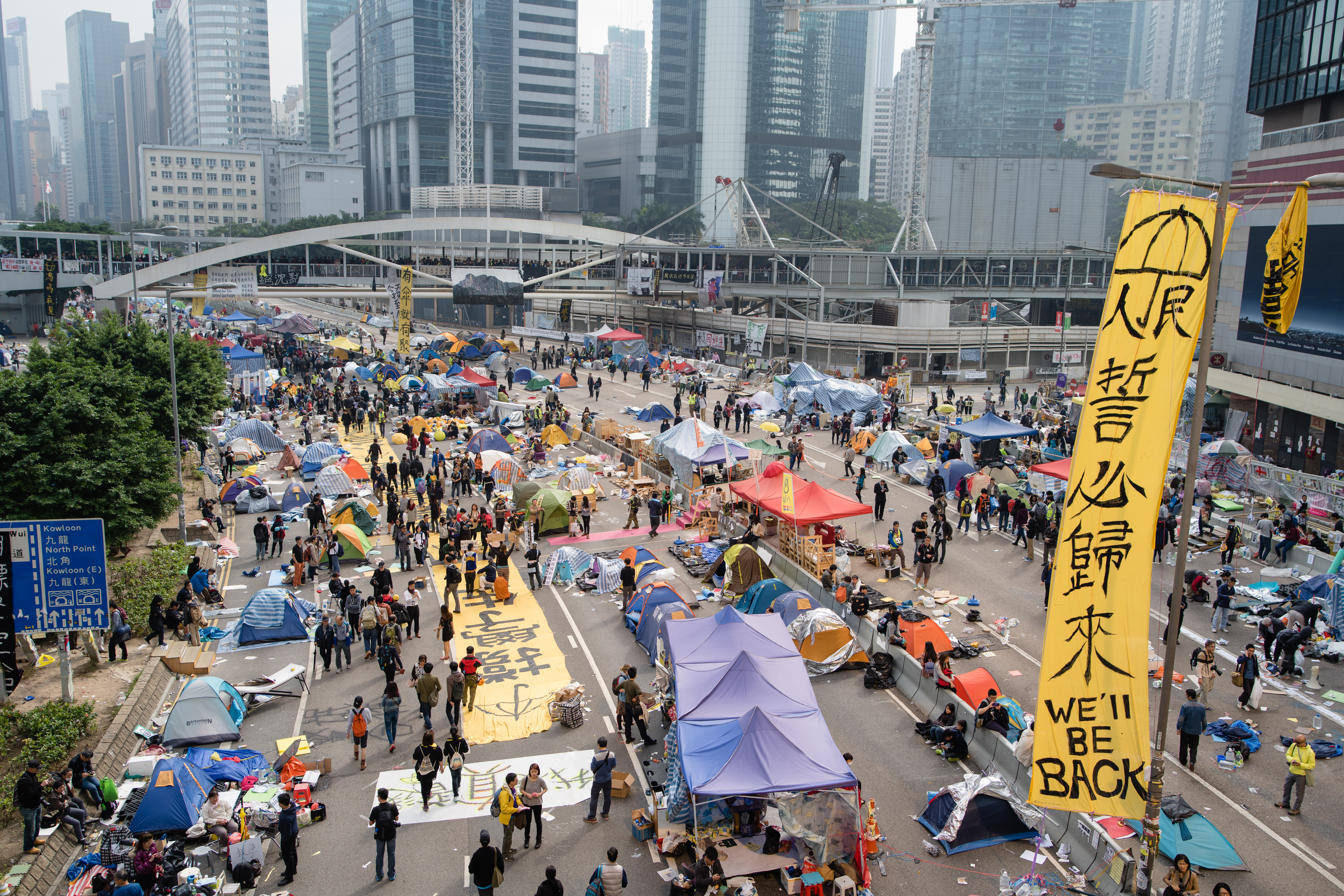
"We Will Be Back" banner ended the Umbrella Movement after 79 days of occupying Admiralty, on December 11, 2014

On the final days of the Umbrella Movement, two over-sized vertical banners, both were yellow with black font, were among the hundreds of pieces of protest materials being cleaned out. The smaller one of the two was originally spread out over Harcourt Road and then later vertically hung on a lamppost that showed "WE WILL BE BACK", in capitalized English and "Citizens swear to return" (「人民誓必歸來」) in Chinese. Another one was horizontally spread out on the occupied Harcourt road, showing in Chinese "Stand With Students" (「撑學生」). Four days later, Hong Kong government reclaimed the three occupied locations and declared the end of the 79-day movement.

==== December 13, 2014 Lion Rock and Devil's Peak ====
As the Umbrella Movement approached its final days, Hong Kong citizens reported sightings of two vertical protest banners today. The one found on Lion Rock showed "Down With CY" (「CY下台」), referring to the then Hong Kong Chief Executive Leung Chun-ying (CY Leung) and the one on Devil's Peak displayed "We Demand Genuine Universal Suffrage" (「我要真普選」).

=== Post-Umbrella Movement ===
Many Hong Kong citizens felt a sense of loss after the Umbrella Movement ended; many activists were arrested and imprisoned, the Chinese and Hong Kong governments continued to suppress their voices such as disqualifying young, localist legislative council candidates on the grounds of lacking national patriotism. For example Nathan Law, the youngest elected Legislative Council member, was disqualified by a judge for taking the oath insincerely. Fewer and fewer young people remembered or attended the annual June Fourth Tienanmen commemoration each year. The 2016 Mongkok Civil Unrest, also known as "Fishball Revolution", markedly show the impatience of Hong Kong people after nearly 20 years of fighting for democracy and the beginning of a more violent clashing with authorities. However, hill-top vertical protest banners continue to surprise, reigniting people's desire to true dual universal suffrage: voting rights to both Hong Kong's Chief Executive and Legislative Council.

==== 2014 ====
===== December 15, 2014 Victoria Peak =====
The day following the cleanup Hong Kongers woke up to two large hill-top vertical banners one hung on Victoria Peak of Hong Kong Island, another one reportedly in Kowloon. The one found over Victoria Peak was the usual yellow-with-black font with an umbrella symbol reminding Hong Kong citizens to "Never Forget Our Origin" (「勿忘初衷」). The banner in Kowloon was never located by firefighters.

===== December 28, 2014 Devil's Peak =====
A 20-meter yellow banner with a new phrase "Hong Kong Add Oil" (「香港加油」) in Chinese characters was found on Devil's Peak in Lei Yue Mun (Yuan Tong) area.

==== 2015 ====
===== June 23, 2015 Hong Kong – Macau Ferry Terminal in Sheung Wan =====
Not all vertical protest banners are political; some could be personal. A man climbed up to the top of the pedestrian bridge connecting the Terminal with Shun Tak Centre and dropped a white banner with black and red fonts. The wordings were blurred by the news agency possibly due to profanity, as the man accused a Macau company and real estate developer of fraud.

===== September 28, 2015 Lion Rock =====
On this one-year anniversary of the Umbrella Movement Hong Kong woke up to another yellow hill-top banner that reads "Dare Not Forget Our Origin" (「毋忘初衷」). The Chinese character in this banner that translated to "not" was a different Chinese character used in the December 15, 2014, banner.

==== 2016 ====
===== March 19, 2016 Hong Kong West Kowloon Rail Terminal =====
With the high-speed rail project going on for the 6th year and billions of dollars overbudget and years of delay, anti-high-speed rail activists climbed up to a crane located at the terminal construction site. The two green banners stated "Reject Single Checkpoint For Two Regions" (「反一地兩檢」) and "Stop Rail Construction" (「停建高鐵」).

===== May 17, 2016 Beacon Hill, Tseung Kwan O, Tsing Yi, and Lantau Island =====
Zhang Dejiang was the first Beijing figure visiting Hong Kong since the conclusion of the Umbrella Movement. The three-day visit was greeted by heavy police presence and at least four vertical banners reflecting Hong Kong citizens' demands of China. A smaller yellow-with-black-font banner was unfurled from a residential unit in Tseung Kwan O that read "We Demand Genuine Universal Suffrage" (「我要真普選」). Although there were reports of police camping out overnight to prevent the incident, nevertheless a bigger vertical banner, also yellow with black font, was hung from Beacon Hill, the steep hill next to Lion Rock. The group League of Social Democrats (LSD) claimed responsibility for this banner that read "We Demand True Universal Suffrage" (「我要真普選」), calling it a "souvenir" for Zhang. As the day continued, LSD put out a second vertical protest banner near the Hong Kong International Airport as a "welcome" sign to Zhang. This banner is black with white fonts, and it stated "End Chinese Communist Tyranny" (「結束中共專政」 ). As the official caravan continued its way into the city, a black vertical banner "Retract August 31 Decision" (「撤回八三一決定」) and a "Universal Suffrage for China" (「全國落實普選」) banner were seen flying along the Tsing-Ma Bridge.

===== June 3, 2016 Beacon Hill =====
Ahead of the annual 1989 June 4 Tiananmen Square protests and massacre vigil the pro-democracy political party League of Social Democrats once again erected a vertical protest banner calling Hong Kong citizens to remember those who died fighting for democracy under Communist China regime. The banner was white with black font, and the words showed "June 4 Never Forget. See You In Victoria Park" (「毋忘六四維園見」).

===== July 13, 2016 Hong Kong Shue Yan University (HKSYU) =====
As graduating high school seniors began applying for university admission, Hong Kong Shue Yan University was found to have multiple blue vertical protest banners hanging on building and lampposts around campus urging students to not apply to this substandard university. The red letters read "Shue Yan Life Regret" (「入樹仁悔終生」).

===== September 28, 2016 Devil's Peak in Lei Yue Mun =====
On the second anniversary of the Umbrella Movement, League of Social Democrats put up a 6-meter "We Demand Genuine Universal Suffrage" (「我要真普選」) banner at Devil's Peak in Lei Yue Mun.

===== October 1, 2016 all university campuses in Hong Kong =====
October 1 is China's National Day, which is also a holiday for celebrations and traditionally no students were on school grounds. However, in a move seen as defiance against China nationalism, a red fabric demanding "Hong Kong Independence" (「香港獨立」)in white font appeared in every single university and college in Hong Kong. The banners were in both Chinese and English. It was reported that a total of 15 higher education campuses saw these banners, some even had a second matching banner with "Hong Kong National Party" (「香港民族黨」), presumably claiming responsibility of the move. Universities were quick to remove the banners, and no action was taken against those who erected the banners. Two years later, slightly before 2018's national holiday, Hong Kong National Party was banned by Hong Kong government citing national security threat.

===== November 24, 2016 Lingnan University in Tuen Mun =====
Before graduation Lingnan University students protested how students had no say in any university affairs, and how the Chief Executive of Hong Kong had access and power so matter-of-factly. The students demanded that the university terminate the current school board governor and remove chief executive as chancellor. They also demanded more student participation and voice. The banner was black with white font and was hung at the main atrium of campus. The eight Chinese words stated: "University Self-Governing Must Be Matter-Of-Fact" (「大學自治，天經地義」).

==== 2017 ====
===== July 1, 2017 Causeway Bay =====
Even as universal suffrage was not realized after the Umbrella Movement, Hong Kong pro-democracy fighters were not deterred to voice their opposition to the Chinese government. Chinese Communist Party general secretary Xi Jinping had just left Hong Kong after a 3-day visit, and within hours Hong Kong citizens took to the street to begin their annual July 1 mass protest again Chinese suppression. Where China silenced dissidents and even imprisoned them, Hong Kong has always been a free place to protest, as guaranteed by the Basic Law. However, the number of participants seemed to be the lowest among past rallies, and participants witnessed a pro-democracy journey split between the young and the old. Where the young Hong Kongers carried vertical protest banners demanding self-determination and Hong Kong independence, and older generation demanded the release of Chinese pro-democracy activist and 2010 Nobel Peace Prize winner Liu Xiaobo. Since his participation in the 1989 June Fourth Tiananmen Square Massacre, Liu has been threatened and repeatedly imprisoned by the Chinese authorities since 1991. A vertical protest banner was carried along the July 1st march with Liu's face painted in color and the words "Immediately Free Liu Xiao Bo" (「立即釋放劉曉波」). 13 days later, on July 13, 2017, Liu passed away in prison.

===== August 20, 2017 Wan Chai =====
Thousands took to the streets today to stand in solidarity of the three young pro-democracy activists jailed for their involvement in the Umbrella Movement 3 years prior. The three young activists were Joshua Wong, Nathan Law, and Alex Chow. A yellow vertical banner was carried horizontally in the protest march that stated "You Make Me Fearless" (「你們令我無懼」).

===== December 30, 2017 Lion Peak =====
From around this time on the usual "We Demand True Universal Suffrage" (「我要真普選」) was no longer used, as if the protesters have given up on the demand after years of fighting. More than a year has past since the last hill-top banner was unfurled. This 2017 30-meter yellow vertical protest banner had a new slogan: "Safeguard Hong Kong" (「守護香港」), written in black font.

===== December 31, 2017 Beacon Hill =====
Immediately following the day prior, another "Safeguard Hong Kong Rally on January First" (「守護香港元旦遊行」) was hung on Beacon Hill. The New Year Day marches have been a Hong Kong fixture since 2010, when a Beijing politician lay out the Basic Law guaranteed Hong Kong universal suffrage of chief executive election in 2017 and Legislative Council election in 2020. However, empty Beijing promises were not realized and Hong Kong people continued to take to the streets, and take to the hills, to show their discontent.

==== 2018 ====
===== February 5, 2018 Wan Chai =====
This black-with-white-font vertical protest banner was put up by Demosisto, a pro-democracy group with which three legislative council election candidates were disqualified by the Hong Kong government. The banner stated: "Refuse DQ, Return Voting Rights" (「不要 DQ，還我選舉權」).

===== February 11, 2018 Central =====
In this protest march various newly emerged Hong Kong localist groups called for Hong Kong Secretary of Justice Teresa Cheung to step down. This black-with-white-font vertical banner demanded "Cheng Yeuk-wah Step Down" (「鄭若驊下台」). Reasons to call for her resignation included her interference with Legislative Council Election that ended with multiple young pro-democracy candidates being disqualified, and the alleged illegal constructions and additions to various properties under her name.

===== March 8, 2018 Beacon Hill =====
In response to the disqualification of legislative council election candidates, a make-up election was about to take place on March 11. Pro-democracy political group League of Social Democrats put out this yellow banner with black font calling Hong Kong voters to "Reject DQ, Let's Vote" (「反DQ齊投票」).

===== May 31, 2018 Pui Ching Middle School, Kowloon City =====
While Pui Ching School official told newspapers that they have been hanging this banner for the last 10 years, nobody seemed to be paying much attention until now. Student council had always received approval from the school authorities before hanging up the banner. The banner was printed on black fabric with white painted Chinese characters that read "Dare Not Forget June Fourth" (「毋忘六四」). The school continued to explain that if the banner stated "Redress June Fourth" (「平反六四」) then the school might consider rejecting the approval as this became a political slogan demanding actions.

===== September 29, 2018 Beacon Hill =====
On the fourth anniversary of the Umbrella Movement a commemorative banner was found hanging on Beacon Hill. This banner, about eight meters long, stated "Against Article 23" (「反23條」), the national security law.

=== 2019–20 Hong Kong Protests ===
The hill-top vertical protest banners have become more creative and the message more dire as the anti-extradition bill protests became more intense and violent. As days became months, the frequency of banner appearances also increased dramatically within the second half of 2019 as protests continued. However, due to COVID and pandemic lock-down, the first half of 2020 saw few banner activities, until the establishment of the national security law on July 1. In addition, the wordings on these vertical protest banners have also evolved. No longer did the Hong Kong protesters hang up "We Demand True Universal Suffrage" (「我要真普選」). In fact, this demand became one of five demands Hong Kong government was asked to address. Protest anthem "Glory to Hong Kong" became the next banner and new protest slogan "Liberate Hong Kong, the revolution of our times" dominated the year's banner content. Lastly, police brutality were increasingly called out by these banners, a sign that reflected the increasing violent and bloody clashes between Hong Kong citizens and the police.

==== June ====
===== June 4, 2019 Beacon Hill =====
Hong Kong is one of a few places that still commemorate those who died in the 1989 Tiananmen Square massacre. On the 30th anniversary of the 1989 Tiananmen Square protests and massacre, someone put a yellow "Dare Not Forget June Fourth" (「毋忘六四」) banner over Beacon Hill.

===== June 5, 2019 Devil's Peak =====
The day after the "Never Forget June Fourth" banner, yet another 15-meter banner was erected over Devil's Peak. This banner stated in Chinese "Lam Sold Hong Kong; Resign!" (「林鄭賣港下台！」) in black font over yellow fabric.

===== June 6, 2019 Lion Rock =====
a 50-meter yellow vertical banner was seen on Lion Rock displaying in black font "No Extradition To PR China" and its Chinese equivalent, 「反送中」.

===== June 7, 2019 Various universities =====
Five universities in Hong Kong jointly displayed various vertical and horizontal protest banners to protest the extradition bill. Hong Kong City University (CityU) was a vertical protest banner in black that read "CityU Against Extradition To China" (「城大人反送中」).

===== June 9, 2019 Wan Chai =====
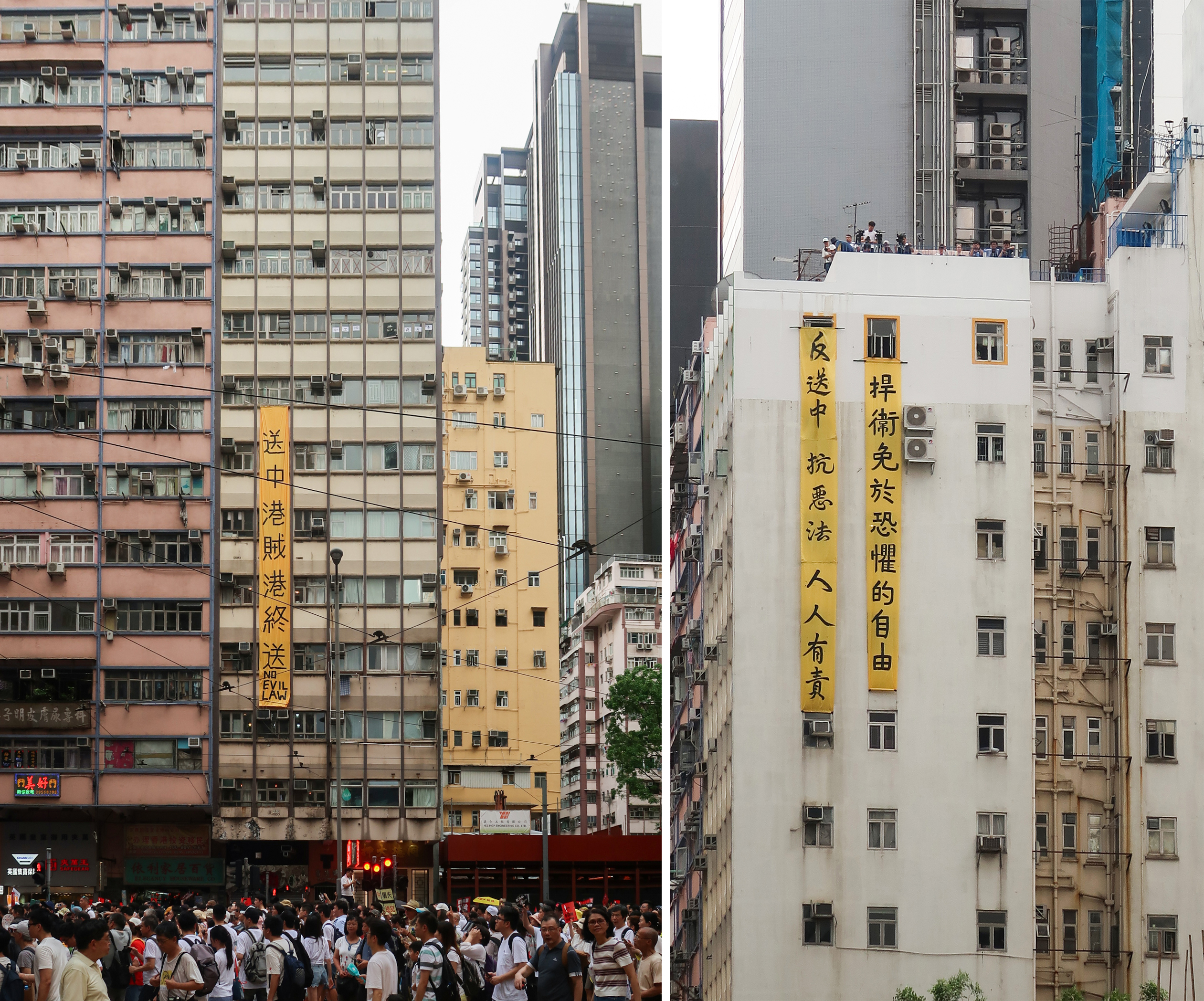
Vertical protest banners showing support along mass rally's route on June 9, 2019.

This mass protest against the anti-extradition bill marked the beginning of a series of struggle in the next years to come. Almost over one million in attendance marching for 3 km from Victoria Park in Causeway Bay to Admiralty. The banners found in Wan Chai were hung from windows of residential flats. The three banners used sophisticated Chinese literary techniques to call for a stronger fight for freedom. From left to right, they can be roughly translated as "Those Who Sell Hong Kong To Extradition Will Not End Well" (「送中港賊港終送」), "Against Extradition, Oppose Evil Law; Every One's Responsibility" (「反送中抗惡法人人有責」), and "Defend Our Freedom to Not Live In Fear" (「捍衛免於恐懼的自由」).

===== June 15, 2019 Lion Rock =====
A new phrase on a 30-meter vertical banner was seen on Lion Rock at around 6 am. The fabric was yellow, but this time a few of the words were printed red. The banner demanded "Safeguard Hong Kong" (「保衞香港」) in Chinese, with the word "safeguard" in red, followed by an English phrase "Fight for HK" with the word "fight" in red.

===== June 16, 2019 Wan Chai =====
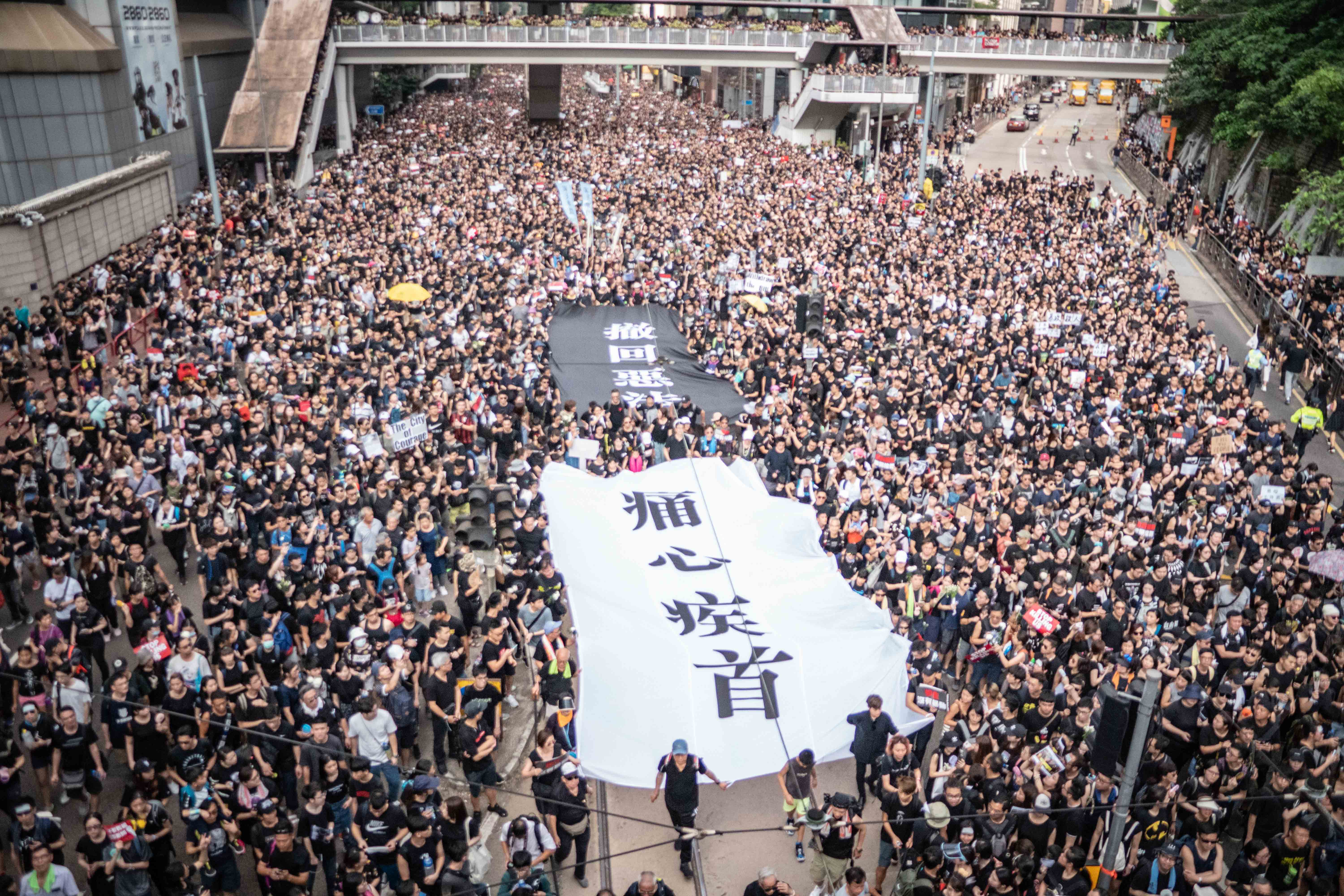
Two contrasting vertical protest banners carried by hundreds of protesters on June 16, 2019

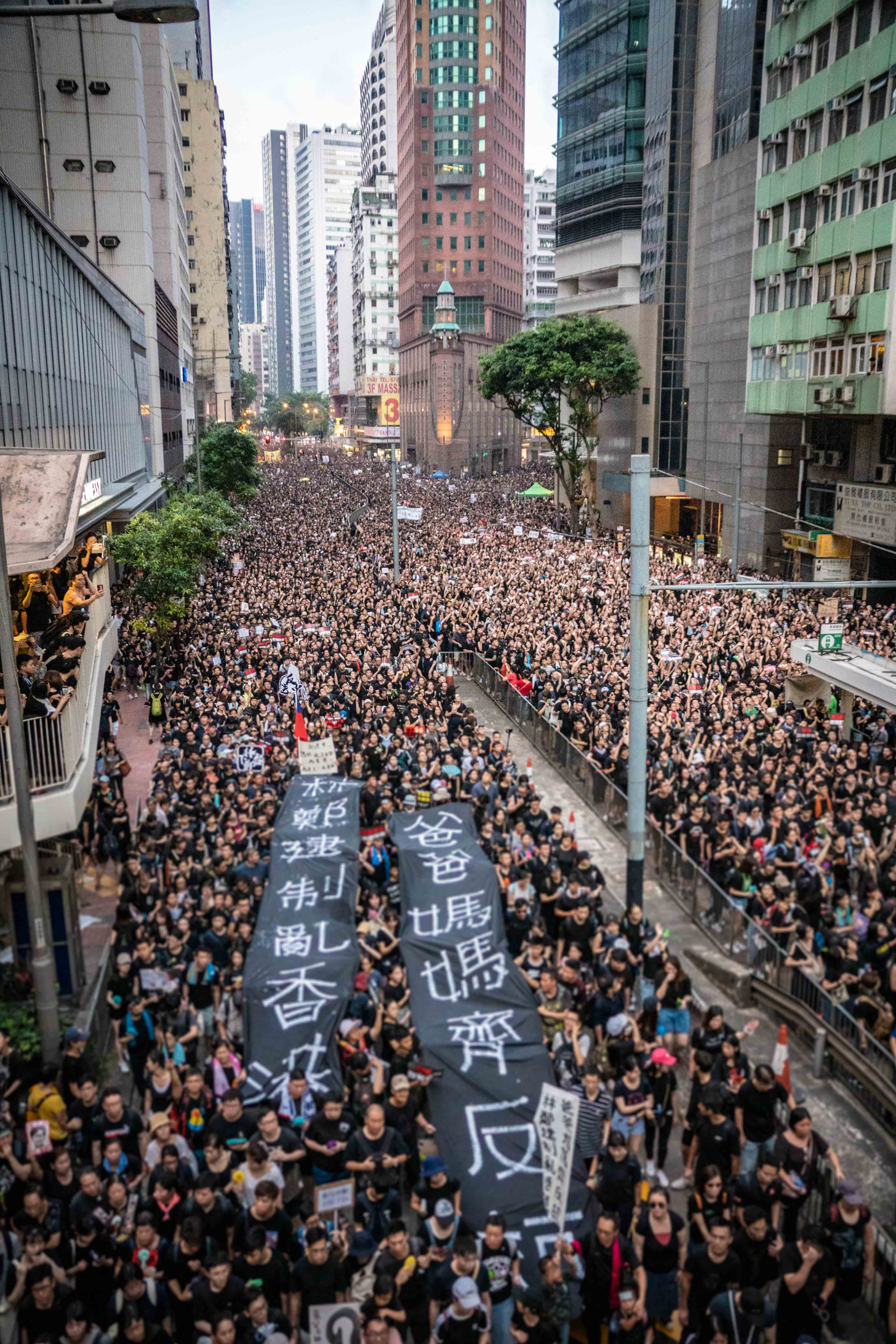
Many vertical protest banners were carried along this two-million mass rally on June 16, 2019.

The record-breaking two million protesters marching along Wan Chai would see these two black vertical protest banners with white fonts calling Hong Kong citizens to "No Retreat, No Disperse! No Surrender! Condemn June 12 Police Violence" (「不撤不散！不妥協！譴責612暴力鎮壓！」). Other vertical protest banners seen in this rally included a two sets of couplets. One stated "Lam And Pro-China Camp Ruins Hong Kong; Dads and Moms Together Resist" (「林鄭建制亂香港」「爸爸媽媽齊反抗」) and the other "Mourning In Pain; Withdraw The Diabolical Bill" ((「痛心疾首」) 「撤回惡法」 ).

===== June 18, 2019 New Town Plaza in Sha Tin and Central =====
In Sha tin, this black fabric with white font vertical protest banner was written in ancient literary Chinese phrase that roughly stated "Why Threaten The People With Death When the People Do Not Fear Death" (「民不畏死奈何以死懼之」). At night, a mass protest march saw almost one million marchers on the streets demanding the withdrawal of the extradition bill. Four black vertical protest banners appeared in this protest with white, hand-written Chinese characters, were couplets. They read: "Law and Order: No Extradition. Protests And Demonstrations Are Not Riots" (「誓守法治反送中 示威抗議非暴動」) and "Shame on Police Brutality, Immediately Release the Arrested" (「警察暴力濫權可恥 即時釋放被捕人士」).

===== June 26, 2019 Police Headquarter in Wan Chai =====
The white "Release All Activists" (「釋放義士」) was noticeably more last-minute than most other vertical protest banners. The banner was hung at around midnight as protesters stormed to Police Headquarter demanding the release of protesters unjustly detained or arrested.

==== July ====
===== July 1, 2019 Legislative Council, Admiralty and Devil's Peak =====
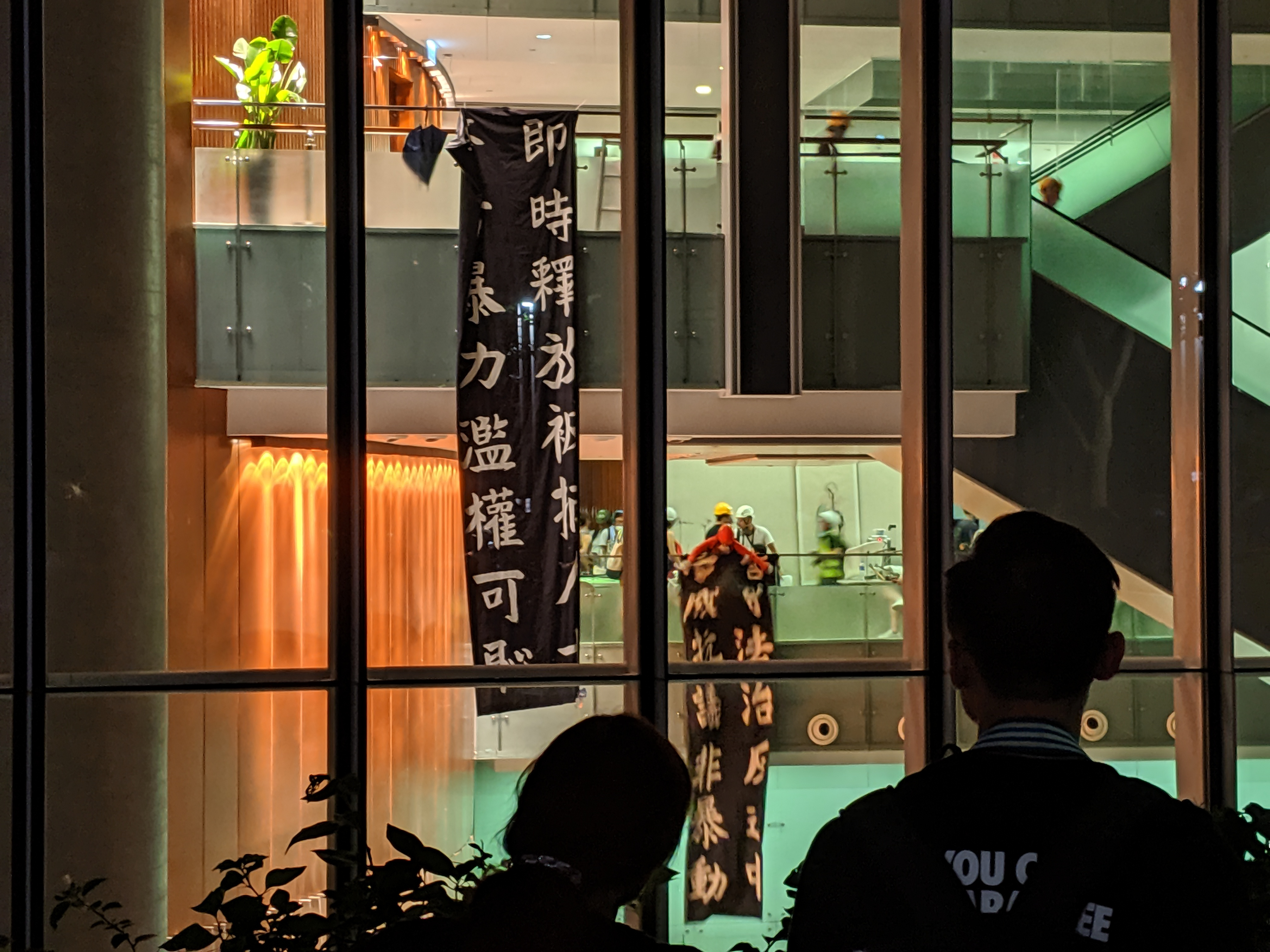
The defining moment of the 2019 Anti-Extradition Bill protest inside Legislative Council building on July 1, 2019

Hanging vertical protest banners indoor has not been frequently attempted in the past few years as fewer people would see the words and their message. The storming of the Legislative Council was one of the key incidents that set the course of the 2019 protests. The four black vertical protest banners were the same ones used on the mass rally on June 18: "Law and Order: No Extradition. Protests And Demonstrations Are Not Riots" (「誓守法治反送中 示威抗議非暴動」) and "Shame on Police Brutality, Immediately Release the Arrested" (「警察暴力濫權可恥即時釋放被捕人士」). Earlier in the day, Devil's Peak saw a white vertical protest banner with words roughly translated into "Mourning in Pain" (「痛心疾首」).

===== July 13–14, 2019 Sha Tin =====
In addition to hanging vertical protest banners on hills and outside of buildings, Hong Kong protesters also use boats to showcase their vertical protest message horizontally moving along the river. A group called "Shatin Commons" claimed responsibility for hiring a boat on Shing Mun River to showcase their white-font-on-black fabric demanding the government to "Withdraw The Bill" (「撤回惡法」). The following day, Sha Tin residents organized a protest carrying two black-and-white contrasting banners: the white banner with black words stated "Mourning In Pain"(「痛心疾首」) and the black banner with white words demanded "Withdraw The Diabolical Bill" (「撤回惡法」 ).

===== July 17, 2019 Central =====
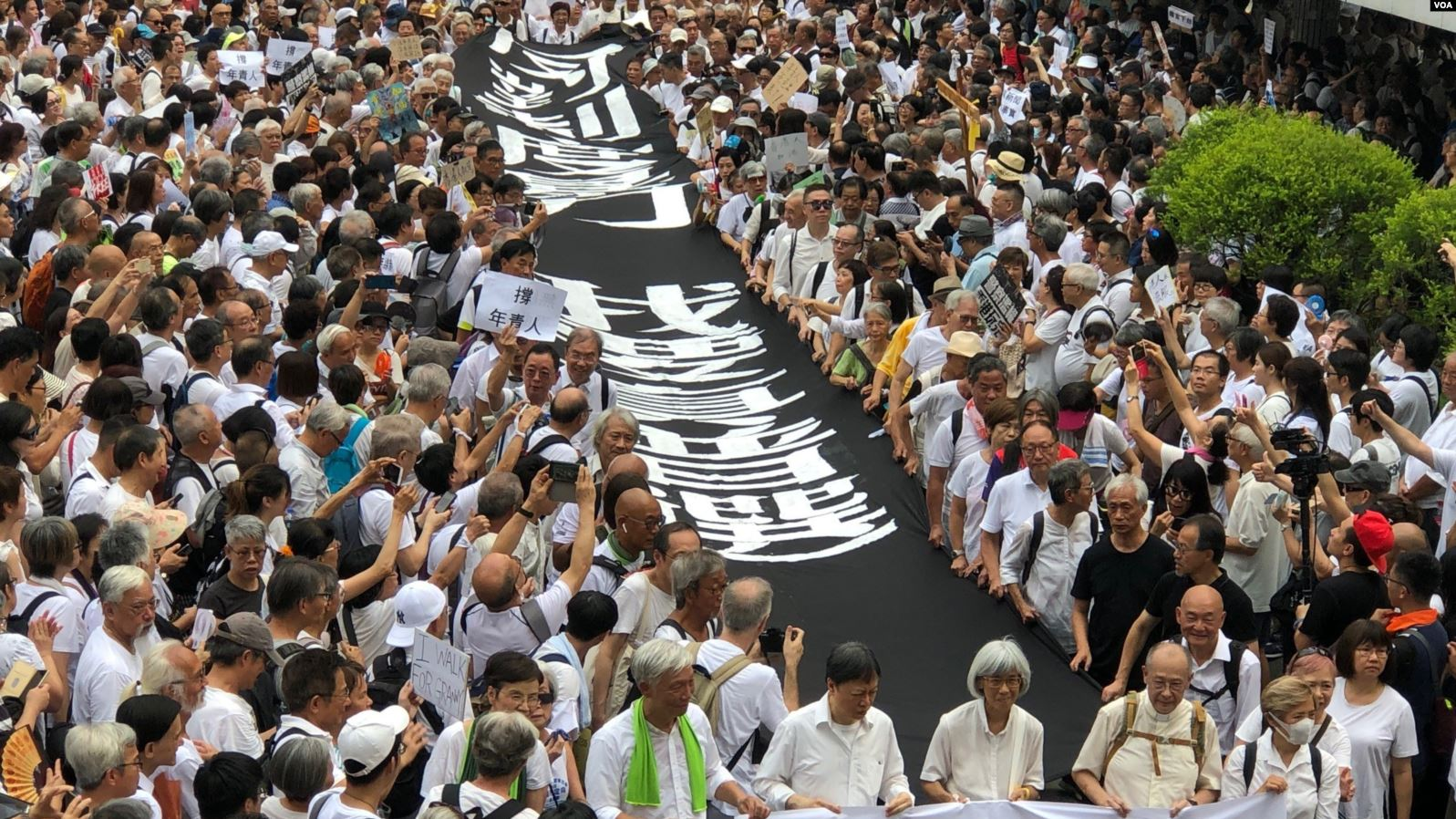
Vertical protest banner carried horizontally in this rally on July 17, 2019.

Thousands of Hong Kong elderly men and women, affectionately known as "silver-hair clan", organized a mass rally to support young front-line Hong Kong activists and denounced police brutality. Their black-with-white fonts banner carried by marchers horizontally along the rally stated "Against Structural Violence; We Demand Genuine Universal Suffrage" (「反對制度暴力 我要真普選」).

===== July 21, 2019 Central =====
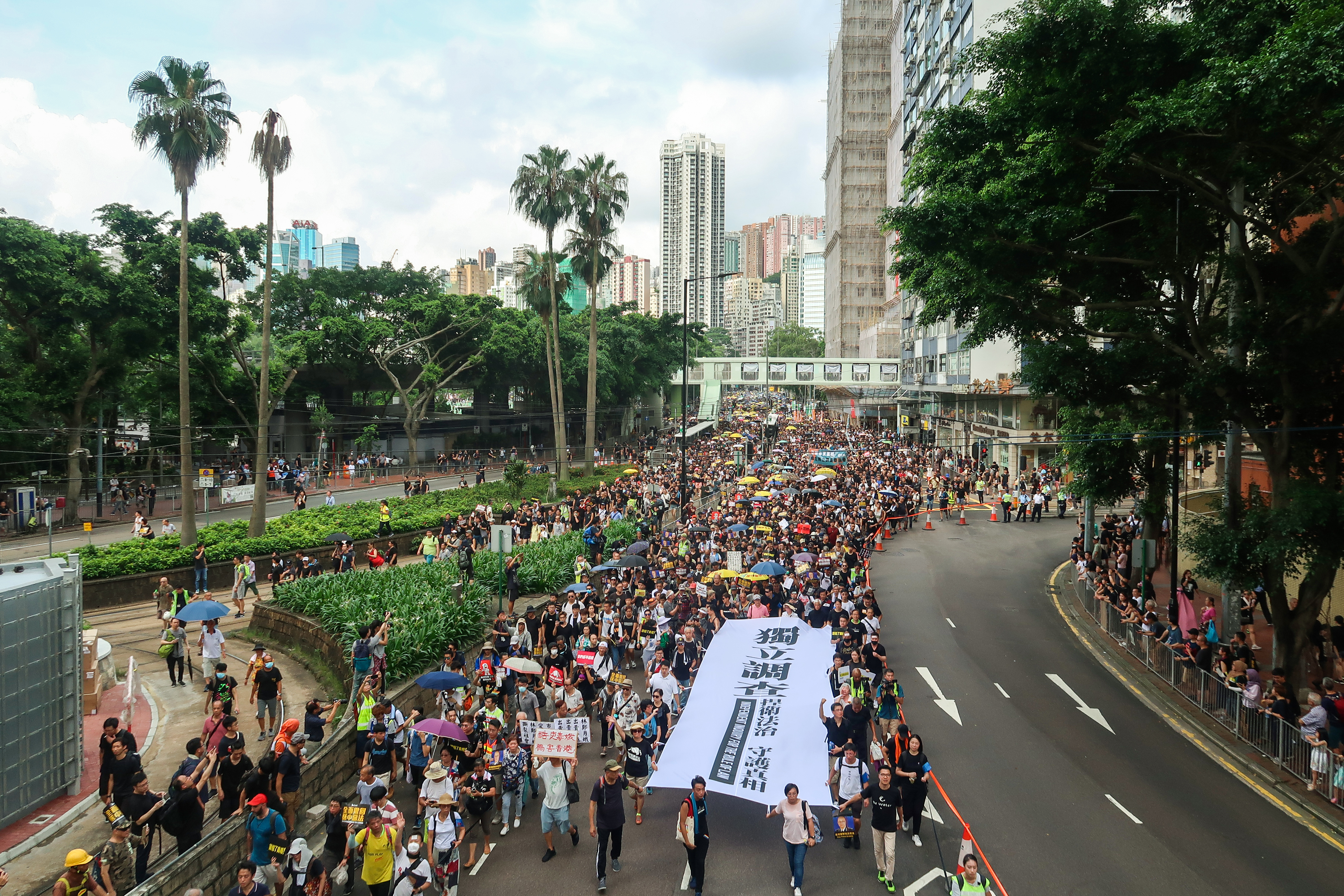
July 21, 2019 Safeguard The Truth vertical protest banner.

This protest was organized by several social worker associations condemning the government's lack of response to the people's demands, causing harm, injuries, arrests, and, indirectly, deaths of Hong Kong citizens. Approximately 4000 social workers participated in this silent march as they carried large vertical banners blaming the Chief Executive Carrie Lam for turning a blind eye to social unrest caused by her inaction. Separately, thousands of protesters also marched from Victoria Park to Central demanding independent investigation on the police. A white banner with words " Independent Investigation. Defend the Law. Safeguard The Truth" (「獨立調查、捍衛法制、守護真相」).

==== August ====
===== August 1–5, 2019 Sha Tin =====
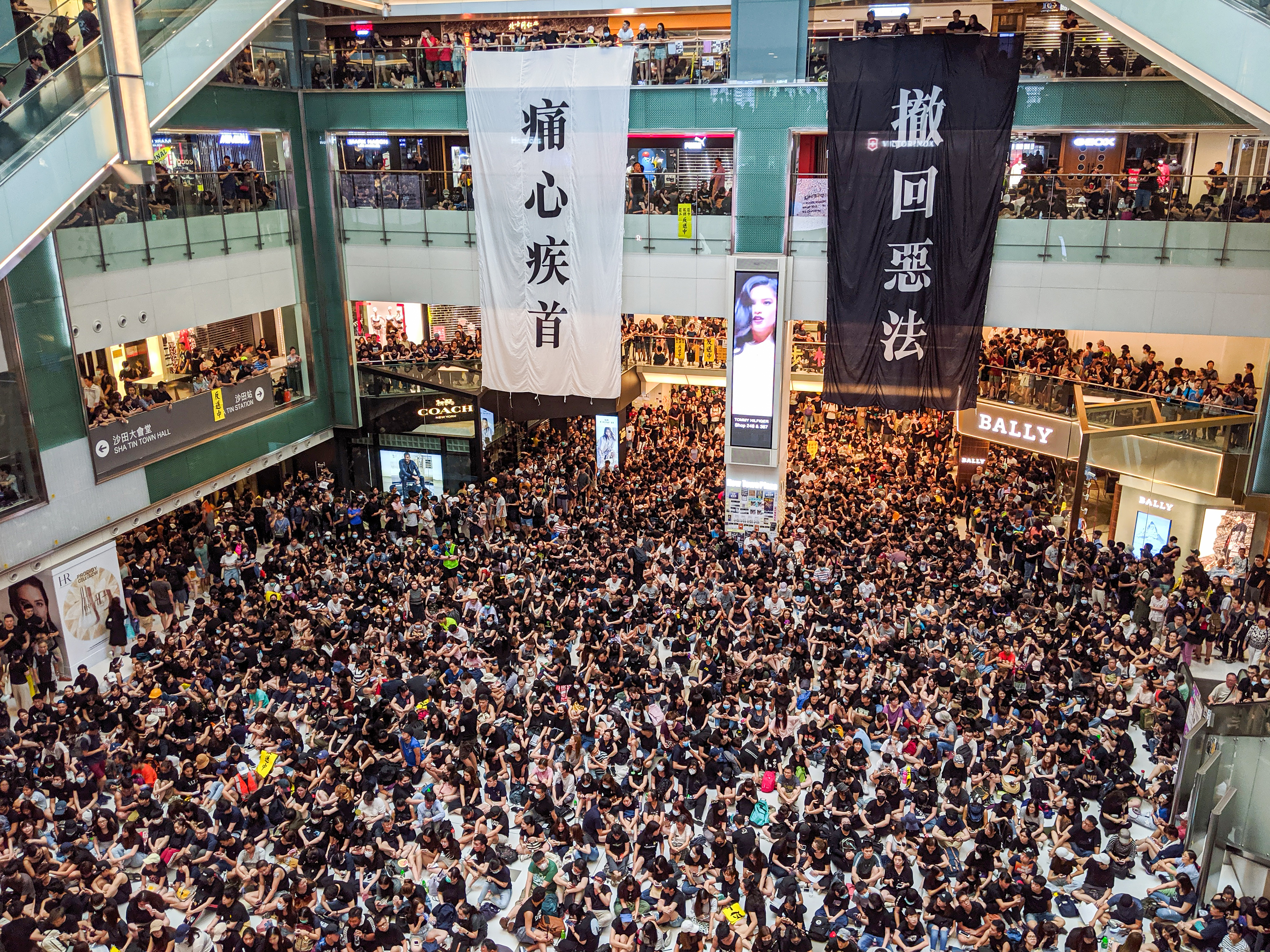
Similar vertical protest banners were seen earlier in a June mass protest. These were hung inside a plaza in Sha Tin on August 5, 2019

Trying to increase participation of the general strike on August 5, Sha Tin residents unfurled a series of vertical protest banners throughout the week inside New Town Plaza. On August 1, two giant black and white fabric banners were hung from the second floor. The white banner with black words stated "Mourning In Pain"(「痛心疾首」) and the black banner with white words demanded "Withdraw The Diabolical Bill" (「撤回惡法」 ). There were probably the same pair of banners saw earlier in Sha Tin on July 14.

===== August 5, 2019 Admiralty =====
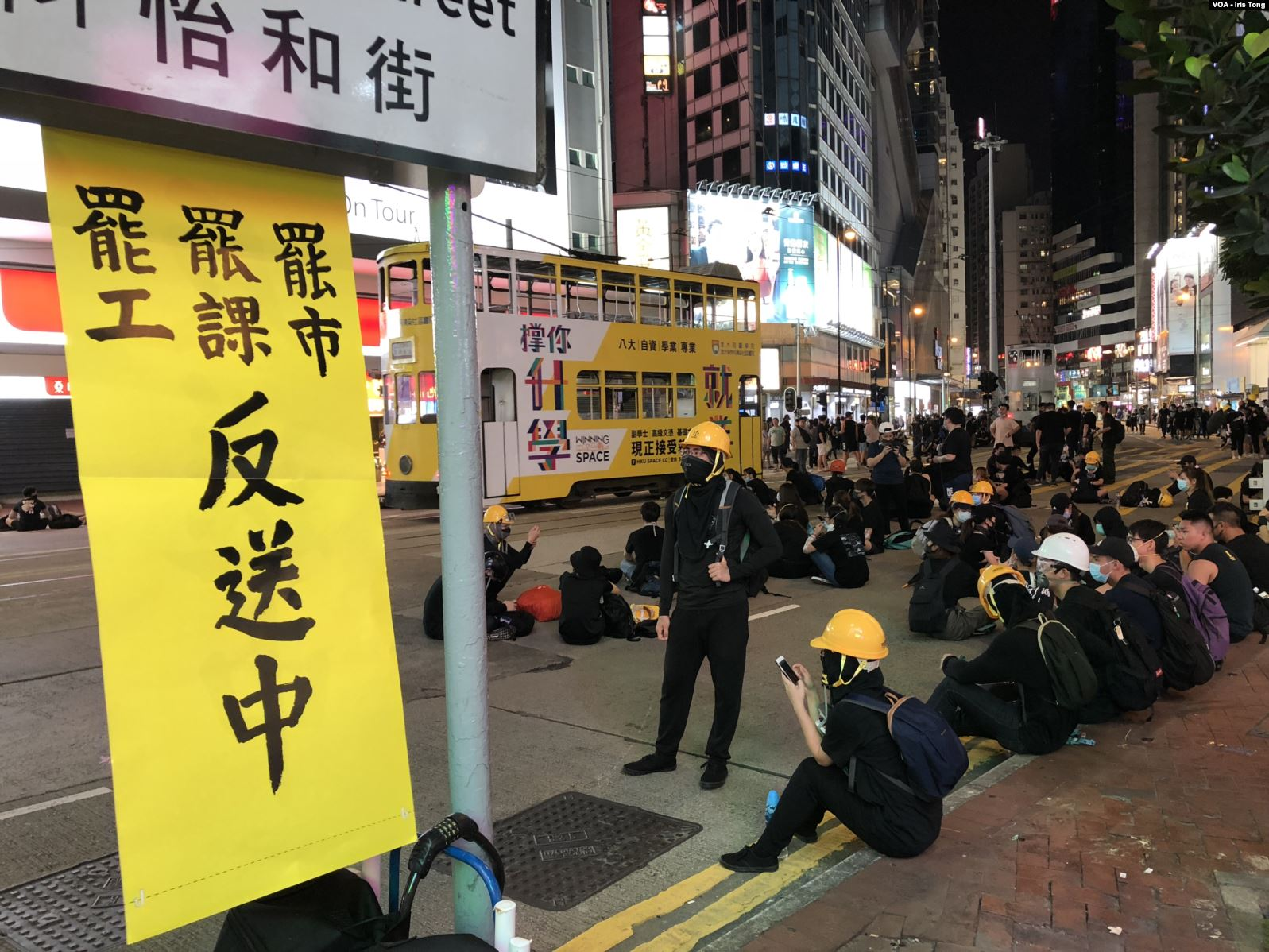
General strike as a tactic to pressure the government, on August 5, 2019.

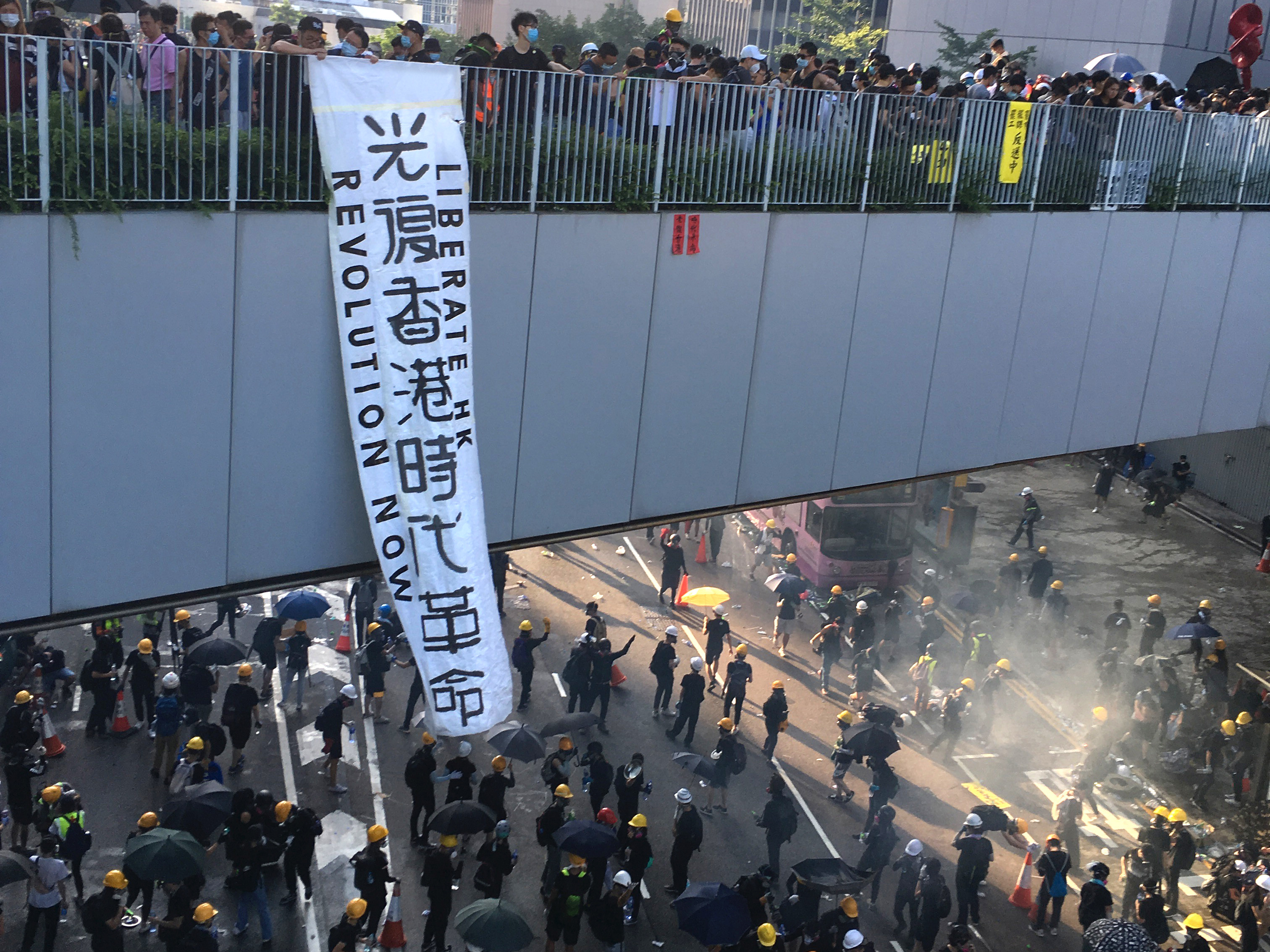
"Liberate Hong Kong, revolution of our times" vertical protest banner on August 5, 2019, in Admiralty

"Liberate Hong Kong, revolution of our times" (「光復香港，時代革命」) was written both in Chinese and in English in black font over white fabric on this day of the "general strike", one of the many protest tactics used to pressure the government to respond to Hong Kong citizens' five demands. Thousands took to the streets in various parts of Hong Kong as they called in sick for work. Hundreds of protesters also trekked into the Hong Kong International airport. Together, hundreds of flights were cancelled, and traffic throughout Hong Kong was paralyzed.

===== August 9–11, 2019 Hong Kong Airport =====
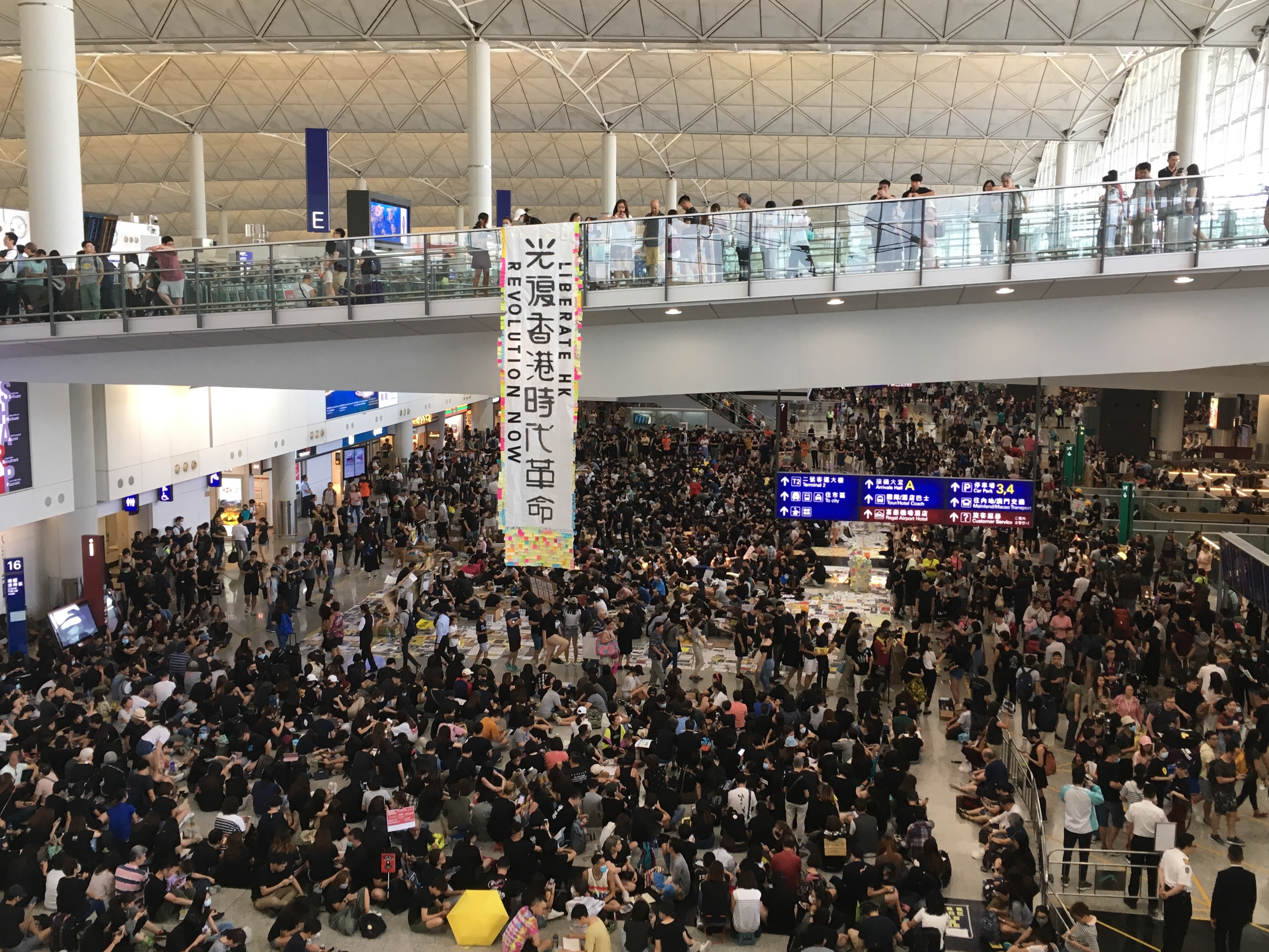
"Fly With You", also known as "Occupy Airport", on August 10, 2019, aimed to raise international awareness of Hong Kong's pro-democracy fight.

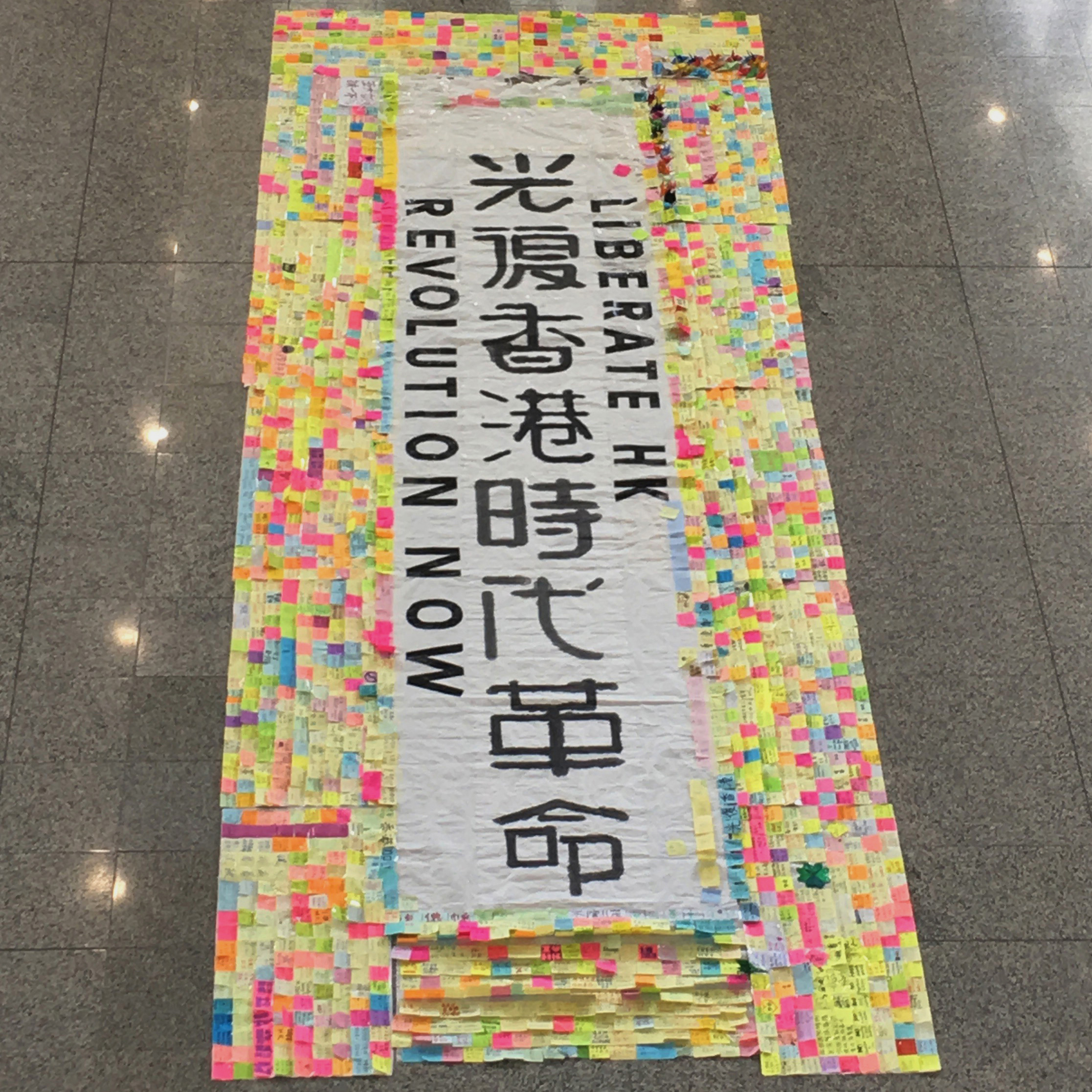
A closer look at the vertical protest banner and its surrounding "Lennon Wall" border, hung in Hong Kong International Airport on August 11, 2019.

The "Occupy Airport" tactic drew thousands of Hong Kong citizens to the Hong Kong International Airport in the midst of summer travel season. The vertical protest banner seen here appeared to be the "upgraded" version of the same one hung over Admiralty five days ago, showing "Liberate Hong Kong, revolution of our times" (「光復香港，時代革命」) with a colorful post-it-memos backed "Lennon Wall" border.

===== August 18, 2019 Admiralty =====
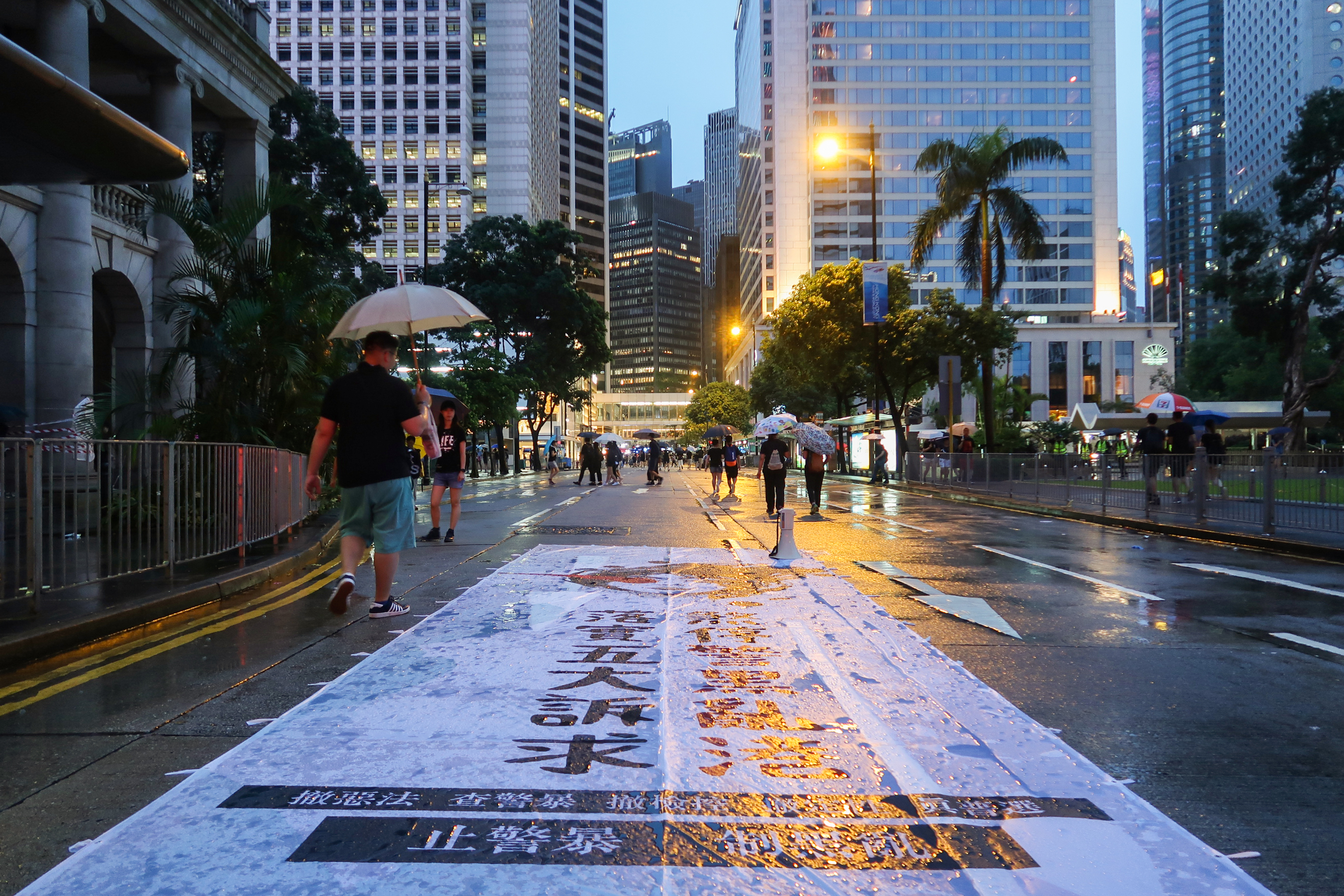
8.18.2019 vertical protest banner.

During the day, over one million Hong Kong citizens marched in the rain to protest on-going police brutality. This marked the 7th mass protest since June. The banner bore the same title as the theme of this rally: "Stop Police Brutality; Grant Us Five Demands"「 煞停警黑亂港落實五大訴求」. Later in the evening, a banner was hung once again from a pedestrian bridge in Admiralty, a popular spot for hanging vertical protest banners since the Umbrella Movement. This white-with-black-font showcased four gigantic characters demanding: "We Demand Democracy" (「我要民主」) with a smaller English phrase written below "We Want Democracy".

===== August 23–24, 2019 Lion Rock =====
The day after the Hong Kong Way human chain peaceful protest event, two black-with-white-font 15-meters long banners were put up over night on Lion Rock. One reads "Evil Police Brutality " (「黑警濫暴」) and the other says "This Regime Kills" (「殺人政權」).

===== August 29, 2019 Beacon Hill =====
As the anti-extradition protests continued, more hill-top vertical protest banners were put out to show solidarity with those who were arrested. The yellow eight-meter long vertical protest banner read "Redress Riot, Release Chivalry" (「平反暴動釋放義士」).

===== August 31, 2019 Beacon Hill =====
On the five-year anniversary of Beijing's refusal to grant universal suffrage to Hong Kong as guaranteed by the Hong Kong Basic Law, two yellow vertical protest banners showed up on Beacon Hill. They were about 15-meters long and demanded "We Demand Genuine Universal Suffrage" (「我要真普選」) and "Retract August 31 Decision" (「撤回人大831」).

==== September ====
===== September 3, 2019 St. Paul's College in Central =====
Students from St Paul's College asked a retired Chinese language arts teacher to pen the vertical couplet banners in support of the anti-extradition bill protest while at school. The poetic literary technique made meaning translation difficult, but they roughly meant "Knowledge Comes From Freedom, Tolerance Unites St. Paul" (「得自由循知識路、容差異繫保羅心」).

===== September 12, 2019 Beacon Hill =====
The protesters in these clashes were often in black bloc, so a common term was developed by the pro-government camp: "Black Rioters". Contrarily, pro-democracy activists called the riot police as "Black Cops", a term signified the actual black color police riot gear and, metaphorically, police brutality. This banner attempted to reverse the government narrative. Made out of black color fabric, this 30-meter long banner showed the phrase "The Rioters Are None Other Than The Black Cops" (「黑警才是暴徒」).

===== September 13, 2019 Kowloon Peak and Victoria Peak =====
Three banners were found today separately in Hong Kong Island and in Kowloon. Two banners were erected on Kowloon Peak. The longer one was black with white font that stated in Chinese "Begin Independent Investigation" (「展開獨立調查」), referring to police brutality, while the shorter one was yellow with black font that demanded "Sanction Corrupted Cops" (「制裁黑警」). The banner found on Victoria Peak had a dimension of 15 meters by 2 meters. Several Facebook users took photographs of the banner, black-in-white-font, with Chinese phrase "Drop Riot Charges" (「撤銷暴動控罪」)but news outlets did not report the wordings or the colors.

===== September 14, 2019 Lion Rock =====
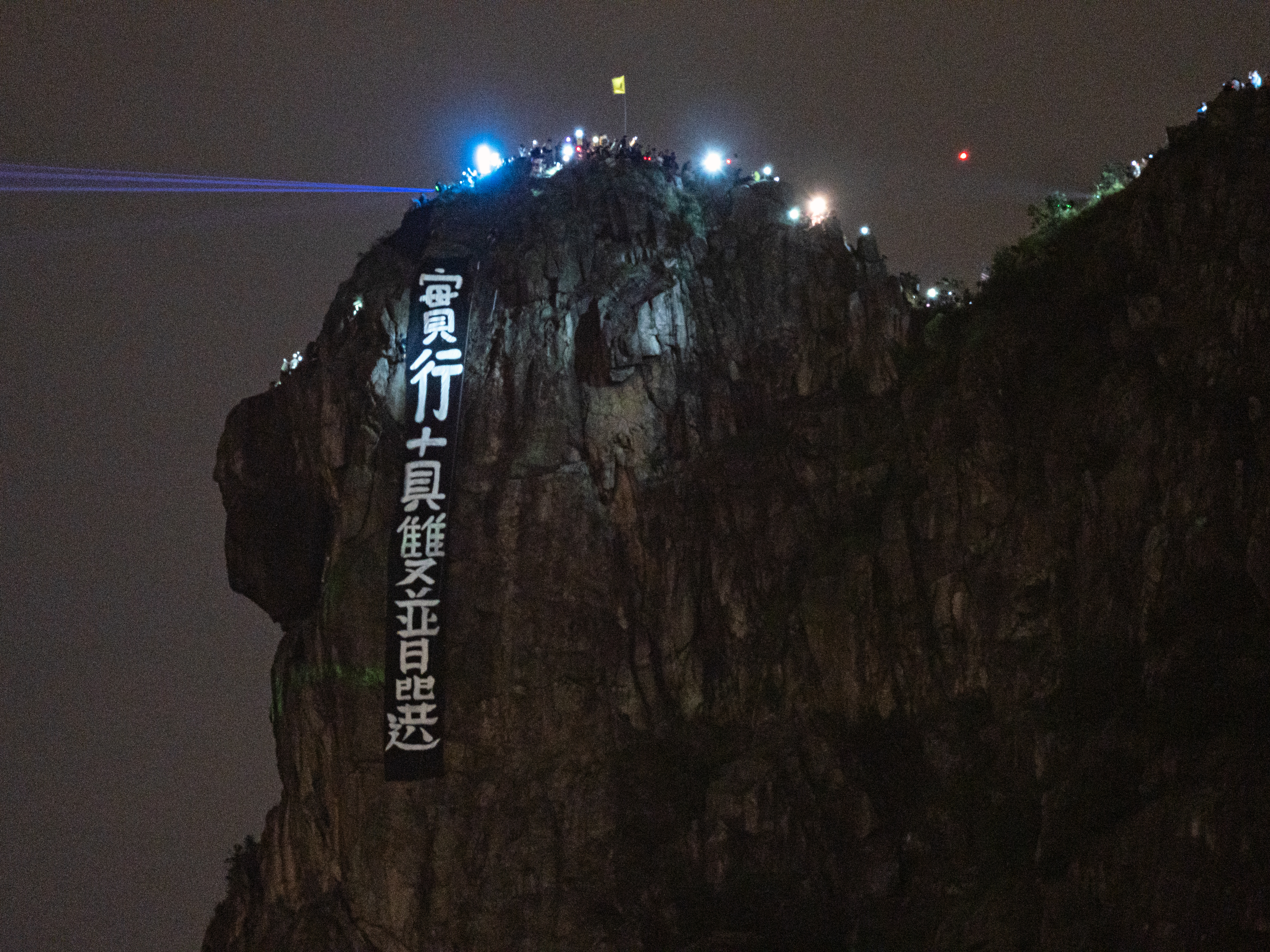
Black-with-white-font banner on Lion Rock on September 14, 2019

On this Mid-Autumn Festival hundreds of Hong Kong citizens celebrated on Lion Rock. They lit up the trail to Lion Rock with their cellphones as they peacefully sing "Glory to Hong Kong" and chanted demands. In addition to the human chain, a 100-ft banner, black fabric with white font that read "Implement Genuine Dual Universal Suffrage" (「實行真雙普選」) was hung over the Lion Rock cliff. An outdoor enthusiast identified as Wong said he and fellow rock-climbing enthusiasts were also responsible for the two other recent banners.

===== September 15, 2019 Devil's Peak =====
This is third consecutive day of hill-top banner hanging. This one was black with white font, demanding the government to "Drop Riot Charges" (「撤銷暴動控罪」).

===== September 16, 2019 University of Hong Kong =====
This pair of banners could be the first couplet with Cantonese profanity, which was condemned and later removed by University officials. The banners read 「港大建築叫極唔郁」and「香港淪陷仲建乜撚」which roughly translate as "Unresponsive HKU Architecture Department" and "Who The Fuck Builds when Hong Kong Falls".

===== September 21, 2019 Beacon Hill =====
Another "The Rioters Are None Other Than The Black Cops" (「黑警才是暴徒」) banner, but this one was printed on yellow fabric, unlike the one two weeks ago on September 12, and was written in blank font.

===== September 22, 2019 Times Square in Causeway Bay and New Town Plaza in Sha Tin =====
While they look relatively small against Lion Rock as their backdrop, these vertical protest banners could actually be quite gigantic when placed indoor. Today in Times Square of Causeway Bay protesters unfurled from the 4th floor an over-size banner demanded "We Long for Glory to Hong Kong" (「我願榮光歸香港」). Unlike outdoor banners that always ended up being confiscated by the firefighters or the police, protesters today were able to recoil the banner and took it with them. Earlier in the day at Sha Tin, two yellow banners with black fonts were erected inside New Town Plaza. The banners read " Truth Be Told. Vow to Eliminate MTR" (「還我真相，誓滅黨鐵」) referring to the earlier Prince Edward MTR Station police attack on August 31. Nine other white banners with black fonts and three black banners with white fonts were hung from second and third floor of the plaza. The three black banners were a triplet, reading from left to right these vertical protest banners gave a warning of the expanding Chinese power: "Yesterday Xinjiang And Tibet. Today Hong Kong. Tomorrow Taiwan" (「昨日彊藏」「今日香港」「明日台灣」). The seven white banners in the middle are read as couplets. The first two together stated "Knowingly Break The Law, Shame on Police" (「知法犯法」「枉為警察」). The next two read: "Why Threaten The People With Death When the People Do Not Fear Death" (「民不畏死 」「奈何以死懼之」). The last three were independent phrases: "Support Voracious Frontline" (「支持勇武」)", "Support Students" (「支持學生」), "Support Peaceful Logical Non-Violent Protesters" (「支持和理非」). The couplet on the third floor read: "Everybody Longs For Democracy and Freedom" (「民主自由」「人所追求」).

===== September 23, 2019 Beacon Hill =====
This yellow banner has the phrase "Disband the Police" (「解散警隊」) written in black and a red check symbol at the end.

===== September 24, 2019 Pacific Place Plaza, Admiralty =====
Possibly the same one used on September 22 in Causeway Bay, a yellow "We Long for Glory to Hong Kong" (「我願榮光歸香港」) banner was unfurled from the third floor inside of Pacific Place in Admiralty. Protesters again were able to collect this banner for later use.

===== September 27, 2019 Central, Lion Rock, and Beacon Hill =====
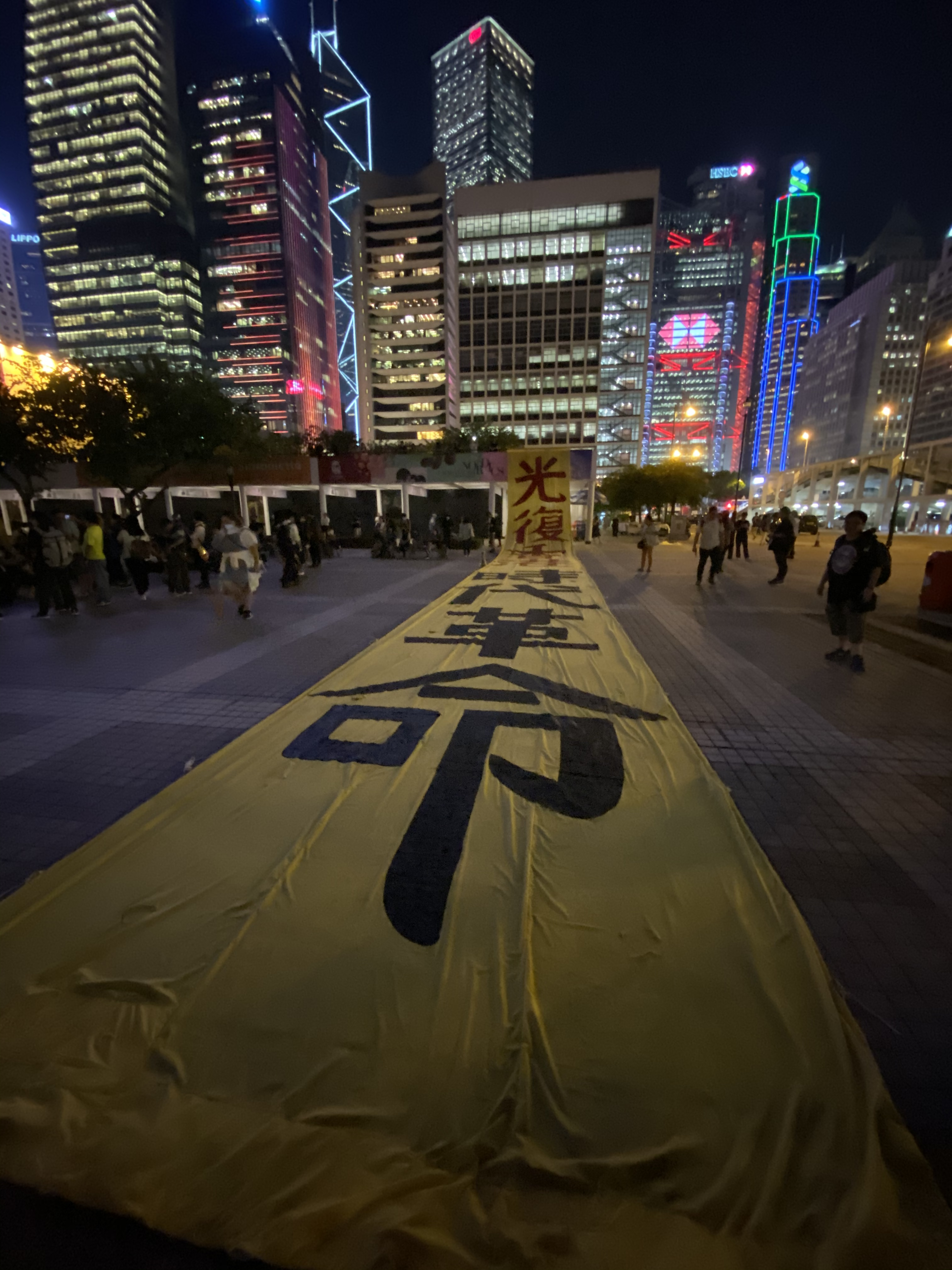
Vertical protest banner hung from the roof of the overhang and continued its spread onto the ground on September 27, 2019.

Thousands gathered at Edinburgh Place in Central to show solidarity against police torture of captured protesters. This banner was hung from the roof and lie horizontally on the ground. The banner read "Liberate Hong Kong, revolution of our times" (「光復香港，時代革命」). Earlier in the day, four individuals climbed to Lion Rock and unfurled two vertical protest banners in blue fabric and white paint that read "God Kill Communist China; Annihilate The Entire Party" (「天滅中共 全黨死清光」). Not further from Lion Rock, another 40-meter vertical protest banner was hung on Beacon Hill that read "October 1: Celebrate His Mom" (「十一‧賀佢老母」), alluding to the anti-China sentiment Hong Kong citizens felt about the upcoming celebratory Chinese National Day.

===== September 30, 2019 Kowloon Hill =====
The day before Communist China's National Day Hong Kongers saw an ironic "End One Party Ruling" (「結束一黨專政」) banner on Kowloon Hill.

==== October ====
===== October 1/2, 2019 Devil's Peak =====
On this 70th anniversary of People's Republic of China, the profane phrase "Celebrate His Mom" (「賀佢老母」) showed up on Devil's Peak. At the same time, Hong Kong citizens crowdfunded to buy whole-page newspaper advertisements on over nine newspapers in different countries to "showcase" this phrase globally. The countries included South Korea, Spain, Sweden, Norway, United Kingdom, Germany, Canada, Argentina, and Mexico.

===== October 6, 2019 Central =====
With Hong Kong police repeatedly, sometimes on camera, beating and delaying rescue, Hong Kong citizens took to the street with a black vertical protest banner written in white color: "Hong Kong Police Intended Murder" (「香港警察蓄意謀殺」). With the anti-mask law took effect immediately, citizens also expressed their anger by hanging a black vertical protest banner in Admiralty stated in both Chinese and in English: "Our Gov Is Killing Us" (「殺人政權」)

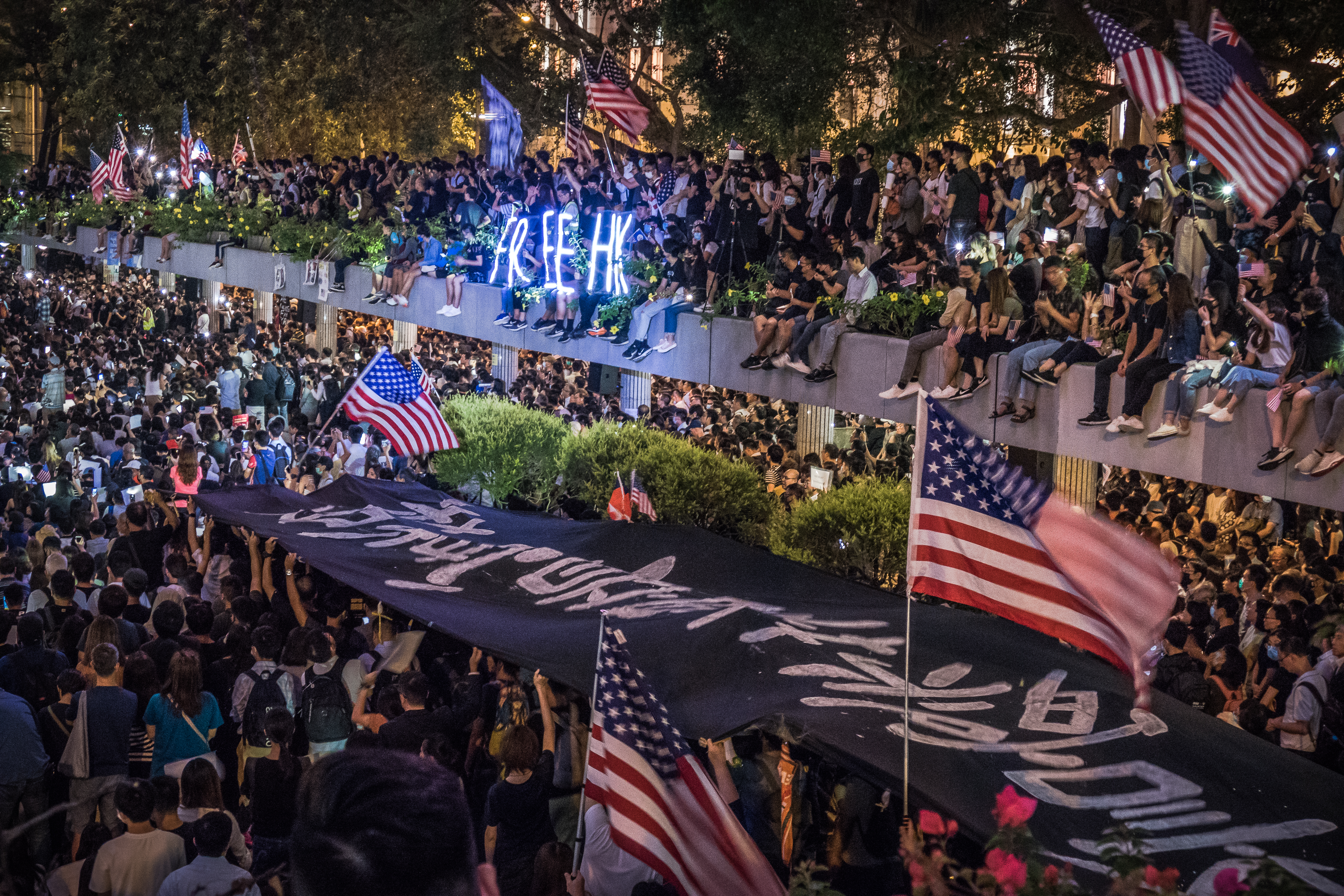
Black vertical protest banner on October, 6 and 14, 2019.

===== October 10, 2019 University of Hong Kong =====
A pair of black vertical protest banners, a couplet, was hung at the main entrance of Hong Kong University accusing the university officials for not speaking up against police brutality, and for not defending Hong Kong freedom. The couplet should read from right to left: "Watching From The Sideline You Ruin Hong Kong's Future. Turning a Blind Eye You Consent to Tyranny's Murders" (「你冷眼旁觀親手斷送香港未來」 「你視而不見淪為殺人政權幫兇」).

===== October 14, 2019 Central =====
The same police brutality banner was again carried along protest route, showcasing citizens' discontent with the words "Hong Kong Police Intended Murder" (「香港警察蓄意謀殺」).

===== October 19, 2019 Tsim Sha Tsui =====
This massive yellow vertical protest banner with black font stated "Citizens' Faces Masked, Carrie Lam's Heart Enshrouded" (「市民蒙面林鄭蒙心」) showed up in Tsim Sha Tsui while concurrently four other districts held mass rallies against Hong Kong Chief Executive Carrie Lam's refusal to dialog with the people and the recently passed anti-mask executive order.

===== October 20/21, 2019 Devil's Peak =====
After making its rounds inside various shopping malls in Hong Kong, this 20-meter yellow banner has now made its way to Devil's Peak. The words demanded "We Long for Glory To Hong Kong" (「我願榮光歸香港」).

===== October 27, 2019 Beacon Hill =====
"Hong Kong Police Intended Murder" (「香港警察蓄意謀殺」) made its way to its final destination: Beacon Hill, where it was then retrieved by firefighters within hours.

==== December ====
===== December 1, 2019 New Town Plaza in Sha Tin =====
On the day a mass protest was organized in Tsim Sha Tsui, a total of 16 white vertical protest banners were erected inside the atrium from the second floor of New Town Plaza of Sha Tin. From left to right the English translations roughly were: "Never Divide" (「永不分化」), "Never Snitch" (「永不篤灰」), "Never Cut Ties" (「永不割席」), "Withdraw Extradition Bill"「(撤回逃犯條例修訂」), "Release All Protesters" (「釋放所有被補抗爭者」), "Retract June 12 Riot Definition" (「收回六一二暴動定性」), "Enact Genuine Dual Universal Suffrage" (「實行真雙普選」), "Deputize Independent Investigative Committee" (「成立獨立調查委員會」), "Nowhere to Retreat" (「退無可退」), "Never Retreat" (「絕不再退」), "Infinite Police Power" (「警權無限大」), "Hong Kong Got Sold" (「香港被出賣」), "I Would Rather Die Trying Than Live Silently" (「寧鳴而死」「不默而生」), " When Tyranny Is The Reality, Revolution Becomes Our Civic Duty" (「暴政成為事實」「革命就是義務」).

===== December 12, 2019 Beacon Hill =====
The same yellow vertical protest banner "Citizens' Faces Masked, Carrie Lam's Heart Enshrouded" (「市民蒙面林鄭蒙心」) used on October 19 showed up on Beacon Hill today.

==== 2020 ====
The COVID-19 pandemic in Hong Kong kept many protesters home as all over the world countries implemented border closure and lock-downs to curb the virus spread. First confirmation of COVID spreading in Hong Kong was January 23. As the city re-emerged from quarantines, and as China and Hong Kong government continued to use this "quiet time" to pushed through their national security agenda, Hong Kongers responded with more hill-top vertical protest banners.

===== January 18, 2020 Beacon Hill =====
This black-with-white-font banner was about 25 meters long. The Chinese characters showed "Hong Kongers Add Oil; Resist and Avenge" (「香港人加油反抗復仇」).

===== May 28, 2020 Beacon Hill =====
This banner was the first one written entirely in English. The demand stated "Say No To Security Law". This 10-meter long banner appeared on the morning of the day the Beijing National People's Congress passed the controversial national security law.

===== May 29, 2020 Devil's Peak =====
This was the second day of the passing of the national security law. This banner was about 30 meters long, and the Chinese characters roughly translated into "Chi-national Security Law Obliterate Hong Kong" (「蝈安法摧毀香港」). The word play on this banner also illustrated the deep mistrust in and disgust of China by Hong Kong people. On this banner, the original Chinese character for "national" (國) was replaced by a more demeaning homophone, made worse by the simplified Chinese character, 蝈, that represented a type of insect such as crickets and locusts in the Orthoptera order.

===== June 5, 2020 IFC in Central =====
Another "Sing With You" event showcasing for the second time "Why Threaten The People With Death When the People Do Not Fear Death" (「民不畏死奈何以死懼之」) in the familiar black fabric with white fonts.

===== June 14/15, 2020 Beacon Hill =====
The looming national security law and the pandemic have both resulted in a gradual decline in street protests. However, hill-top vertical protest banners continued to appear unexpectedly. Seen in the early morning, a 25-meter black-with-white font "One Country One System Hong Kong Game Over" (「一國一制香港玩完」)

was found hung in Beacon Hill.

===== June 17, 2020 Beacon Hill =====
A 30-meter black-with-white font banner written in English only "HK Can't Breathe" was found on Beacon Hill. This alluded to the phrase "I can't breathe" and the murder of George Floyd in the United States that caused a months-long protest against police brutality in the US.

===== June 22/23, 2020 Lion Rock =====
Another 30-meter black-with-white-font but this time it called Hong Kong citizens to "Fight Against Diabolical Law: Head To the Street On July 1" (「七一上街抗惡法」).

===== June 30, 2020 IFC in Central =====
On the eve of the Beijing-enacted national security law taking into effect, this is the third time Hong Kong citizens saw this vertical banner and this time it was erected in International Finance Center (IFC) in Central. This was a black fabric with white font written in ancient Chinese phrase that roughly stated "Why Threaten The People With Death When the People Do Not Fear Death" (「民不畏死奈何以死懼之」).

=== Post-National Security Law ===
Since the establishment of the controversial Hong Kong national security law Hong Kong citizens seen a drastic decline in protest frequency and scale. Hill-top vertical protest banners also came to a halt as citizens continued to reassess the risk now penalized by imprisonment, possibly for life. More and more pro-democracy activists have fled the city, and more and more protesters, some times even lawmakers, previously arrested were now charged with rioting pending trial.

==== July 1, 2020 Causeway Bay and Wan Chai ====
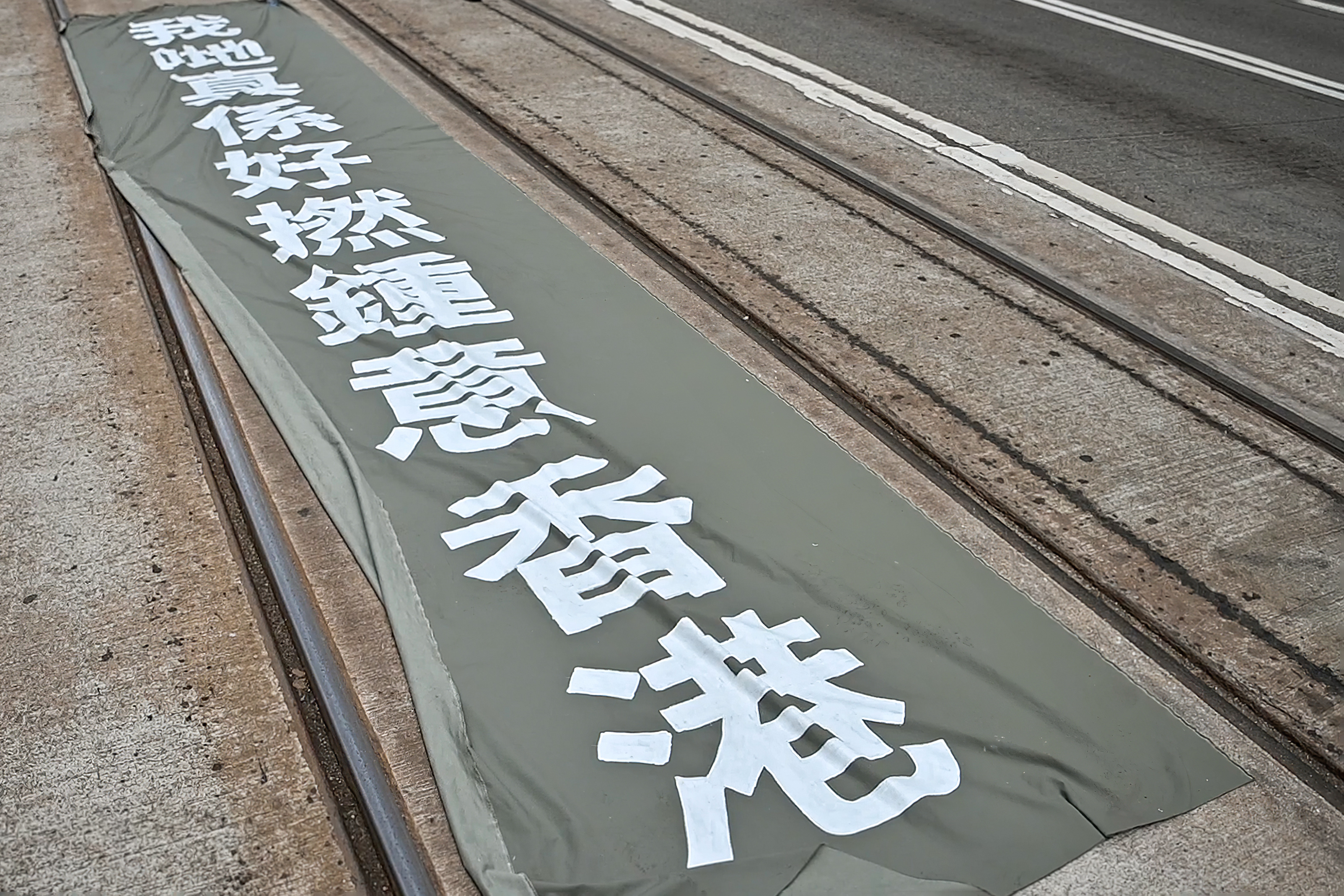
First vertical protest banner since the enactment of the national security law on July 1, 2020

Even though the police denied the July 1st mass rally application for the first time since 2003, over 100,000 Hong Kong citizens took to the streets in Causeway Bay and Wan Chai to voice their dissatisfaction of the national security law and of the decline of Hong Kong's freedom and increased censorship. This banner was the second one that contained profanity: "We Really Fucking Love Hong Kong" (「我哋真係好撚鍾意香港」). This banner was a call to the citizens amid national security law fear, to remember that these protests all originated from the love for Hong Kong. Many pro-democracy art work spawned from this banner thereafter.

==== September 21, 2020 Devil's Peak ====
This banner was a response to Hong Kong government's decision to postpone the much anticipated Legislative Council election for a year. The 20-meter banner was printed on black fabric with white fonts, and it demanded the government to "Initiate Legislative Council Election Now" (「立即啟動選舉」).

==== September 26, 2020 Shau Kei Wan ====
With 2020's Mid-Autumn Festival coincides with China's National Day on October 1, unhappy Hong Kong activists erected a 20-meter long black-with-white-font vertical banner calling citizens to "Celebrate His Mom On October 1st" (「十.一.賀佢老母」). This was the second year this profane phrase appeared on the hills of Hong Kong, albeit at a different hill top. However common and colloquial, this phrase explicitly showed anger towards China and Hong Kong's unwillingness to surrender. Last year on October 1, a local Hong Kong group called "G20" successfully bought full-page advertisements in nine different countries' newspapers using the same phrase "Celebrate His Mom On October 1st". The group, founded before 2019 G20 Osaka Summit, had three goals: to pay tributes to freedom fighters slaughtered and suppressed by Communist China's 70 years of ruling, to bring awareness of the Hong Kong resistance against China to the world, and to invite the world to stand against China. The countries included South Korea, Spain, Sweden, Norway, United Kingdom, Germany, Canada, Argentina, and Mexico.

==== October 7, 2020 Kowloon Peak ====
see also "2020 detainment of Hong Kong residents at sea by China"

On the 45th day of the capture and detainment of 12 Hong Kong residents at sea by the Chinese coastguards, a black-with-white-font vertical protest banner showed up around midnight on Kowloon Peak. The phrase「無理禁錮 釋放12子」roughly translates as "Illegal Detainment; Release The 12".

==== October 20, 2020 Beacon Hill ====
A black-with-white-font banner appeared on Beacon Hill. The phrase 「國安惡法 自由盡失」roughly means "Freedom is totally lost under the evil national security law".

==== November 12, 2020 Legislative Council Building ====
After the four popular-elected democratic legislators were stripped of their council qualification, the entire democratic party resigned in unison to protest the invasion of democracy. The pair of white vertical banners were hung inside the legislative council building, and they read 「林鄭禍港殃民 月娥遺臭萬年」. A rough English translation would be "Lam is a national sorrow; specter of Carrie will last for ten thousand years".

==== December 22, 2020 Devil's Peak ====
Anti-Communist and pro-democracy Next Media founder Jimmy Lai has been in custody and repeatedly denied bail since December 3. A black vertical banner was found unfurled on Devil's Peak with words "Lawless imprisonment of Jimmy Lai" (「禁錮黎智英無法無天」).

==== January 23, 2021 Tsz Wan Shan ====
Hong Kongers put up two 20-meter black vertical banners in Tsz Wan Shan demanding the release of political prisoners (「釋放政治犯」及「FREE ALL POLITICAL PRISONERS」).

==== February 6, 2021 Kowloon Peak ====
A 10-meter long black banner with words「蝈安狗吃孩子的血」was found hung on Kowloon Peak, directly facing the Hong Kong Police dormitory building. The phrase can be translated roughly as "Communist Chinese national security dogs are feasting on children's blood".

== See also ==
- Art of the Umbrella Movement
- Umbrella Movement
- 2019–2020 Hong Kong protests
- Lion Rock
- Alain Robert (climber)
- Banner drop
- Blank paper protest
