= Art of the 2019–2020 Hong Kong protests =

Activists and artists taking part in the 2019–2020 Hong Kong protests used artwork, painting, music, and other forms of artistic expression as a tactic to help spread awareness about the events that have happened in the city. Individuals who create protest art are commonly referred to as the "publicity group" (文宣組). Creating protest art is seen as a peaceful, alternative way for citizens to express their views without participating in protests. Most members work under pseudonyms to protect their identity and stay in line with the movement's leaderless nature.

During the protests, numerous original artworks inspired by pop culture and fine arts, as well as derivative works were created. They served as subversive criticisms of the police and the government, and offered comedic relief during tense times. Much of Hong Kong's protest artwork was inspired by Japanese anime and favoured dystopic and anti-authoritarian themes. Several notable protesters, Pepe the Frog, and Lady Liberty Hong Kong became icons of the protests. In addition, the protests have inspired the creation of "Glory to Hong Kong", which was then adopted as the movement's unofficial anthem.

The protest art in Hong Kong helped sustain the momentum of the 2019–2020 Hong Kong protests due to its creativity and its distribution methods. It was widely distributed using social media channels like AirDrop and Telegram, while printed posters were plastered on Lennon Walls. These protest artworks were then re-disseminated through photos of Lennon Walls shared online. These distribution methods created a level of fluidity that was previously unseen in Hong Kong. Some of the protest arts, such as crowdfunded advertisements, helped draw international attention, while performative protests such as flash mob singing of Glory to Hong Kong at shopping malls created iconic and viral moments during the protest movement.

== Literary art ==
=== Cantonese wordplay ===
Due to the existence of homophones in Cantonese, Hong Kong's language allows great potential for wordplay. Replacing characters with similar tones or pitch patterns can significantly change a phrase's meaning. An early slang term for the protest, "sending to China" (送中), which is a homonym for "to see off a dying relative", quickly gained attention. Another popular slang term "Railway of the Communist Party" (黨鐵) is a wordplay of MTR Corporation because they sound phonetically similar. To deter online trolls and alleged Chinese spies monitoring the forum, some netizens communicated using phonetically spelled Cantonese words, which are difficult for mainland Chinese to understand. A variety of Cantonese slang also developed during the protest; for instance, when protesters recount the events of their "dreams" (發夢), they are recounting their experiences during the protests. When protesters deploy "fire magic" (火魔法), they are throwing petrol bombs. When a protester chants "it is raining" (落雨), fellow protesters will unfurl their umbrellas to hide the group in action. Fellow protesters were called "hands and feet" (手足), which conveyed the idea of unity.

Protesters also ridiculed statements by Hong Kong Chief Executive Carrie Lam and the police. According to the Japan Times, "the legions of tech-savvy youngsters never miss an opportunity to invent new chants, memes, banners and slogans that often turn the criticism against the movement on its head". As a result, the protests led to the creation of caustic memes such as "reporter your mother" (記你老母) and "freedom hai" (自由閪), which mocked the police's use of profanity against reporters and protesters respectively. The latter phrase is derogatory because the word "hai" is one of "the five great Cantonese profanities" but the protesters embraced the term with pride then turned them into WhatsApp stickers and printed them on T-shirts and banners. Artists created a variation of the "Bingo" mini-game that allows people to guess what Lam may say during a press conference to mock her condemnations of the protests; Lam often used the same set of words or four-character idioms to describe the protest.

=== Common themes and slogans ===
==== Guiding principles ====
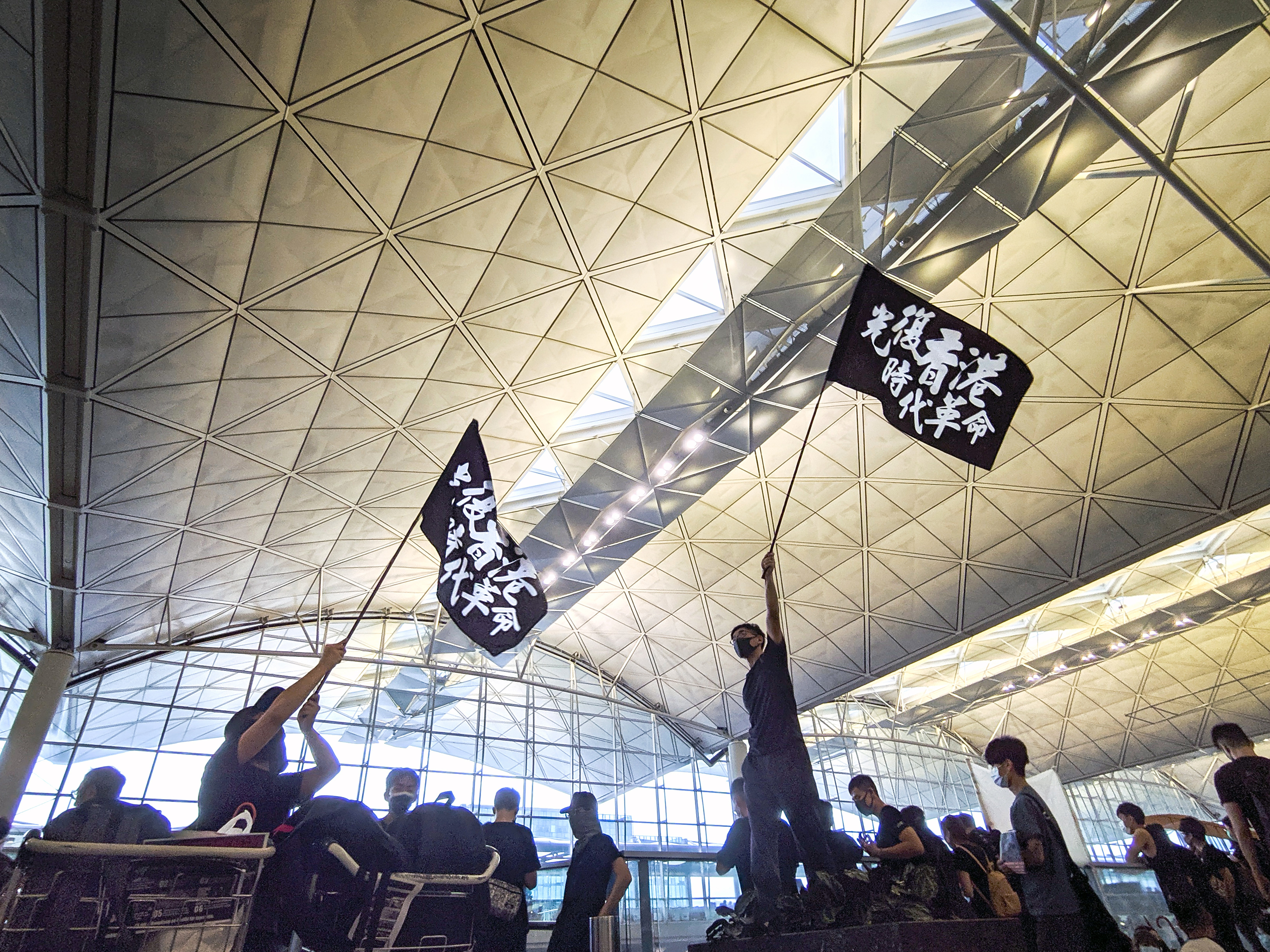
The slogan "Liberate Hong Kong, the revolution of our times" displayed at the Hong Kong International Airport, August 2019

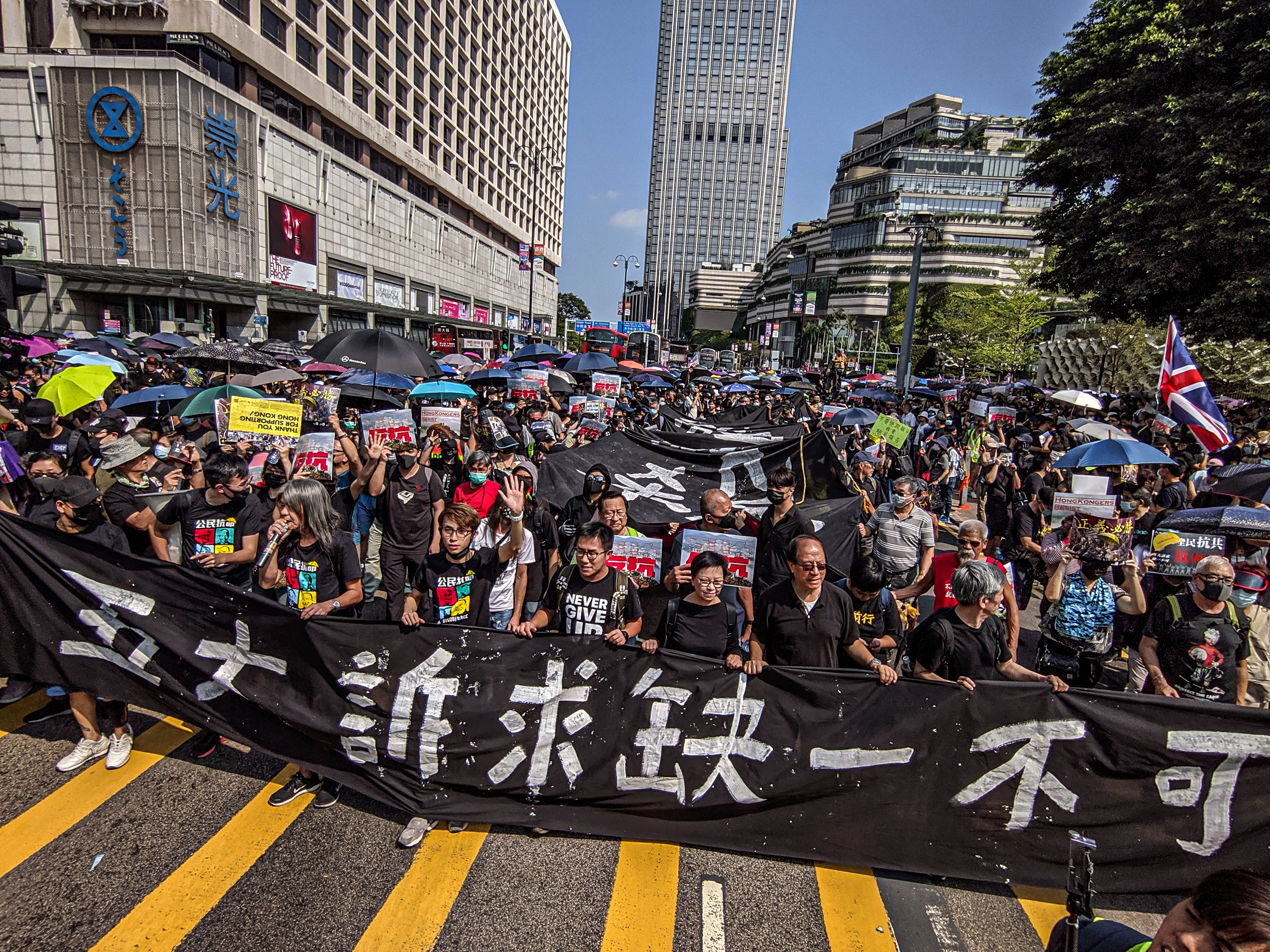
The slogan "Five demands, not one less" displayed in Tsim Sha Tsui, October 2019

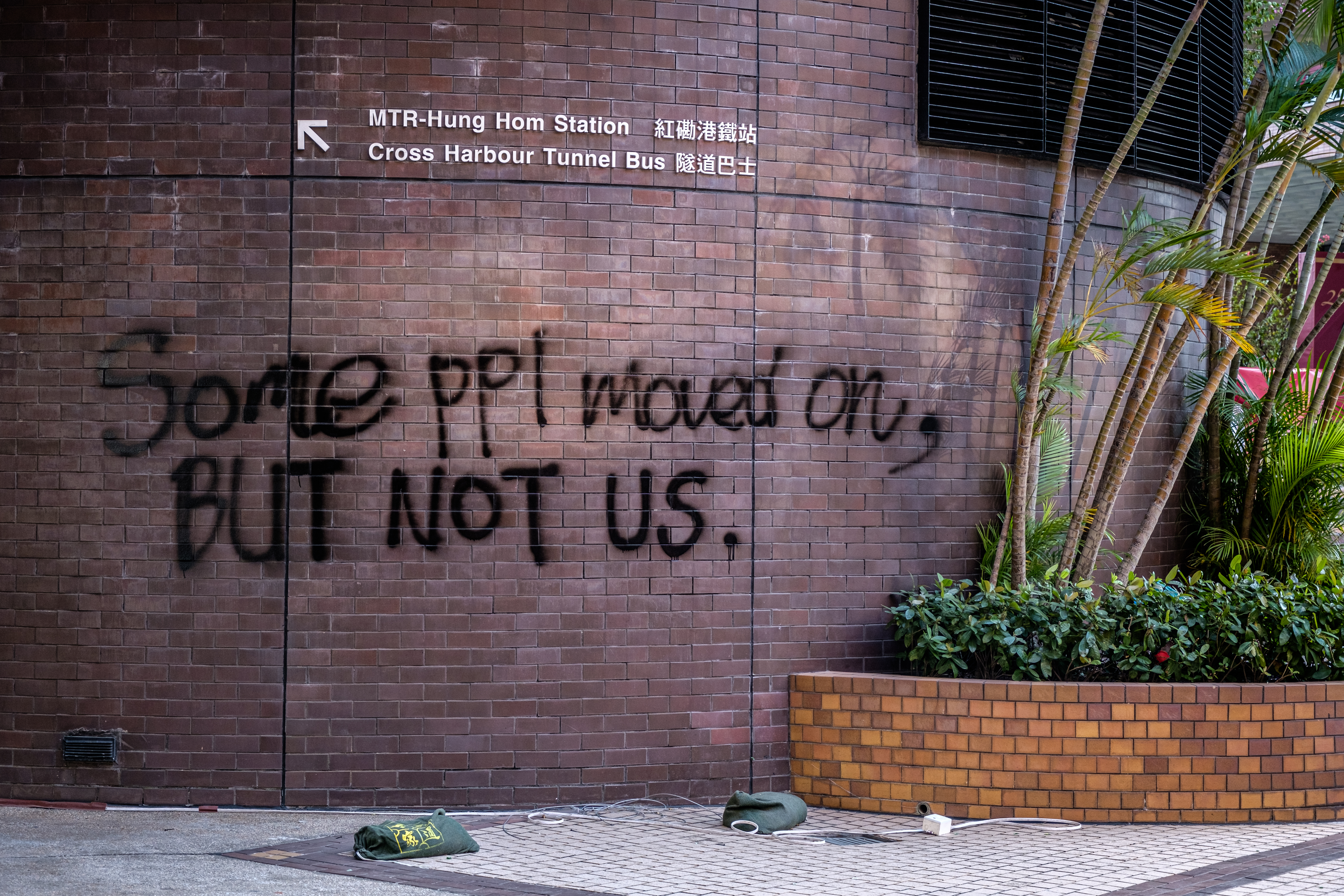
A graffiti inside Hong Kong Polytechnic University. The quote originates from the film Avengers: Endgame.

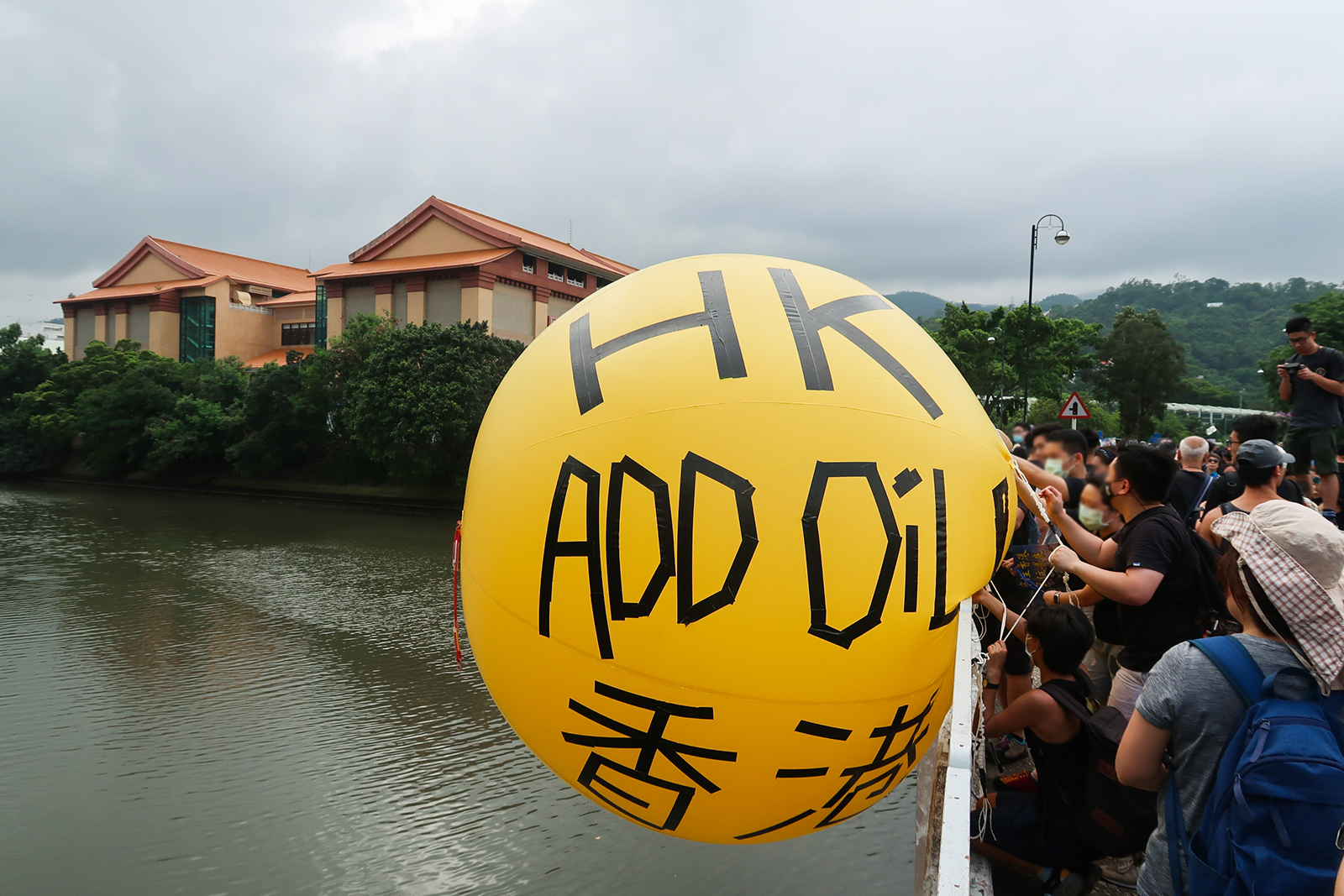
The slogan "Hong Kong, add oil" on a yellow ball in Sha Tin, July 2019

The Hong Kong protesters have created a variety of slogans to raise awareness and express their solidarity; these were chanted during mass marches and from their apartments at 10:00 pm as part of the "Million Scream" campaign. The slogans were generally used to express dissatisfaction with the government, boost morale, reiterate demands and the key principles of the movement. They included the following:

- "Hongkongers, add oil" (香港人，加油); initially a rallying cry for the protesters to encourage each other and to gain strength and support, the slogan changed to "Hongkongers, resist" following the implementation of the anti-mask ban. As protests continued to escalate, it changed to "Hongkongers, revenge" (香港人，報仇) following the death of Chow Tsz-lok.
- "Five Demands, Not One Less" (五大訴求，缺一不可); a slogan used to iterate the protesters' five core demands and affirm their determination not to stop until the government met all of them. It was often used during the protests but especially after Mayor Carrie Lam agreed to answer one demand by withdrawing the extradition bill.
- "Liberate Hong Kong, the revolution of our times" (光復香港，時代革命); first introduced by pro-independence activist Edward Leung as his campaign theme for the Legislative Council by-election in 2016, the slogan gained more popularity as the protests escalated. Lam said the protests were a series of separatist riots though Ma Ngok, a political scientist at Chinese University of Hong Kong, said the slogan has much room for interpretation and its rise in popularity was due mainly to people's belief the authorities have lost their moral basis of power. Election officers asked several candidates standing for the District Council election the meaning of the slogan before they validated their qualification. Following the passing of the National Security Law by the NPCSC for Hong Kong, the HKSAR government declared that anyone shouting or displaying this slogan may have breached the law. Protesters have since found workarounds and created other alternatives.
- "We go up and down together" (齊上齊落); following several suicides, the protesters have chanted this rallying cry to raise people's mental-health awareness and express unity among themselves. There were also several slogans that fostered solidarity within the protester camp, including "no splitting and no severing of ties" (不分化，不割席), and "brothers climbing mountains, each offering one's efforts" (兄弟爬山，各自努力). A hyperbolic version of the former slogan emerged following the Airport protests in mid August, with protesters declaring that they would not severe ties "even with a nuclear blast" (刻爆都唔割席）.
- "Fight for freedom, stand with Hong Kong"; the slogan was used to call for the international community, the US in particular, to support the ongoing protest movement. When Daryl Morey tweeted his support, China temporarily suspended all NBA broadcasts.
- "There are no rioters, there's only a tyrannical regime" (沒有暴徒 只有暴政); after police characterised the protest on 12 June as a riot, protesters demanded the government retract the classification.

==== Slogans influenced by pop culture and social media ====
Protesters have often taken inspiration from historical events and pop culture. This includes:

- "Give me liberty or give me death!", from Patrick Henry's speech during the American Revolution.
- "If we burn, you burn with us", a quotation from Suzanne Collins's 2010 novel Mockingjay; the latter phrase was among the graffiti sprayed during the storming of the Legislative Council Complex on 1 July 2019. Analysts believed it reflects the more desperate tone of the protests compared with that of the Umbrella Revolution and the laam chau doctrine.
- "Save our Hong Kong by ourselves" (自己香港自己救). A similar quote "Save our country by ourselves" (自己國家自己救) was originally used in a Taiwanese social movement when China initiated a sovereignty claim on Taiwan. The quote was then appropriated by Hong Kong protestors and first used in the annual protest on 1 July 2014.

==== Nicknames ====
Protesters frequently call members of the police force "dogs", "triads", "popo", and "Black Police". Police officers have called the protesters "cockroaches". Graffiti that cursed the police has also been depicted.

Counter-protesters and pro-Beijing activists have widely circulated the slogan "I support Hong Kong police, you can hit me now" (我支持香港警察 你可以打我了) on Sina Weibo after protesters cornered and assaulted a reporter from the Global Times at Hong Kong International Airport on 13 August 2019. After Liu Yifei shared the phrase on her Weibo page, there were calls to boycott her upcoming film Mulan.

=== Literature ===
Hong Kong-based Australian lawyer–author Antony Dapiran penned a book entitled City on Fire. His prologue, called "City of Tears", describes how police had unleashed in excess of 16,000 canisters of tear gas during the protests, including more than 2,330 on a single day in November. It begins: "Tear gas rounds describe a graceful arc as they drop down out of the blue sky, trailing feathery tails of smoke like streamers".

== Visual art ==
=== Protests-influenced artwork ===
Protesters create posters to promote upcoming protests and rallies that sometimes serve as subversive criticism of the police, the government, and others. They are sometimes meant to provide light, comedic relief by satirising recent events. Art is also created to show the unity among protesters, encourage fellow activists, and raise mental-health awareness. Posters are seen as a peaceful, alternative way for citizens to express their views without participating in protests. Most artists remain anonymous or used a pseudonym in line with the movement's leaderless nature. Ideas for their designs were crowdsourced using the forum LIHKG, where users vote for the best for wide distribution, typically via Lennon Walls erected throughout the city, Telegram's channels and Apple's AirDrop features. Satirical images and caricatures of political figures, in particular Carrie Lam, were very common, as artists vented their frustration and anger through producing these drawings. One of the more notable images was a parody of My God, Help Me to Survive This Deadly Love, which replaces the original characters with Lam and Xi Jinping.

Protesters have typically adopted the Japanese anime art style. The themes of some Japanese anime also resonated with the protesters, as the narratives of these anime mirror the situation in Hong Kong. For instance, arts inspired by Neon Genesis Evangelion became popular among the artists as it revolves around idealistic teenagers who rise up to challenge adults who are perceived to be corrupt, echoing the situation in Hong Kong. One Piece's emphasis on unity also made it an inspiration when the artists were creating posters to urge citizens to stay united and not to sever ties with the more radical protesters. TV producer Peter Tsi added that Japanese pop culture had a profound influence on youths who were born following the handover of Hong Kong. Values in these anime shows, such as "upholding one's ideals, resistance to authorities, and unity", as well as resisting "hypocritical, corrupted, and selfish" adults or superiors, became deep-rooted in young people's minds.

Inspiration was taken from various other pop culture media. When the Student Union president of the Hong Kong Baptist University was arrested for possessing laser pointers, described by the police as "laser guns," protesters created a series of posters incorporating a variety of Star Wars themes and elements such as lightsabers.

Dan Barrett noted that protesters favoured dystopic and anti-authoritarian themes in their designs. According to him "(Genres depicting) heroes and heroines defeating evil totalitarian regimes and rulers, despite insurmountable odds, appear to be particularly motivating among the younger generation of Hong Kongers on the frontline of the resistance movement." Many protest art designs resemble album covers or Hollywood movie posters. Several notable people from the protests were subjects of artworks, including Marco Leung (who fell to his death on 15 June 2019 while wearing a yellow raincoat, which became emblematic), a woman whose eye was bleeding (alluding to the 11 August 2019 incident where a female protester's eye was allegedly injured by a bean bag round), and Chan Yi-chun, a protester arrested during the 15 September 2019 North Point conflict, were common characters found in protest art. The yellow hard hat protesters commonly worn as part of their "full gear" also became the symbol of the movement and appeared in many protest arts.

Traditional Chinese elements were also incorporated into the designs. Hell money and joss papers imprinted with key government officials' faces were also created and burned as the protesters followed the traditions of the Hungry Ghost Festival. Some protest posters replicate the design of a traditional Chinese almanac. Protesters created "elder memes" (長輩圖), which aimed to inform senior citizens about the events in the city to sway them to their cause. Elder memes are images that use bright and colourful graphics with usually outdated fonts, overlaid with pictures of flowers or religious symbols.

A large variety of derivative works were also created in the protests. The design of the MTR's warning signage was reworked to a set of "Mind the Thug" cards using the same typography, referencing the Yuen Long attack. Artists have also reworked several historical paintings to fit the Hong Kong context. For instance, the French revolutionaries portrayed in Liberty Leading the People by Eugène Delacroix were changed to people donning the protesters' attire. The Creation of Adam by Michelangelo was also reinterpreted to portray secondary school students participating in a human chain outside their schools. Photos taken by journalists have also been converted into artworks. Some art was also inspired by wartime recruitment posters.

Pro-Beijing activists have also created their own protest art, mainly portraying protesters as an insolent group of rioters and depicting the police as a group of "righteous" heroes maintaining the city's order. Protesters were also depicted as "cockroaches" after the police begun using the term to describe them.

=== Neighbourhood Lennon walls ===
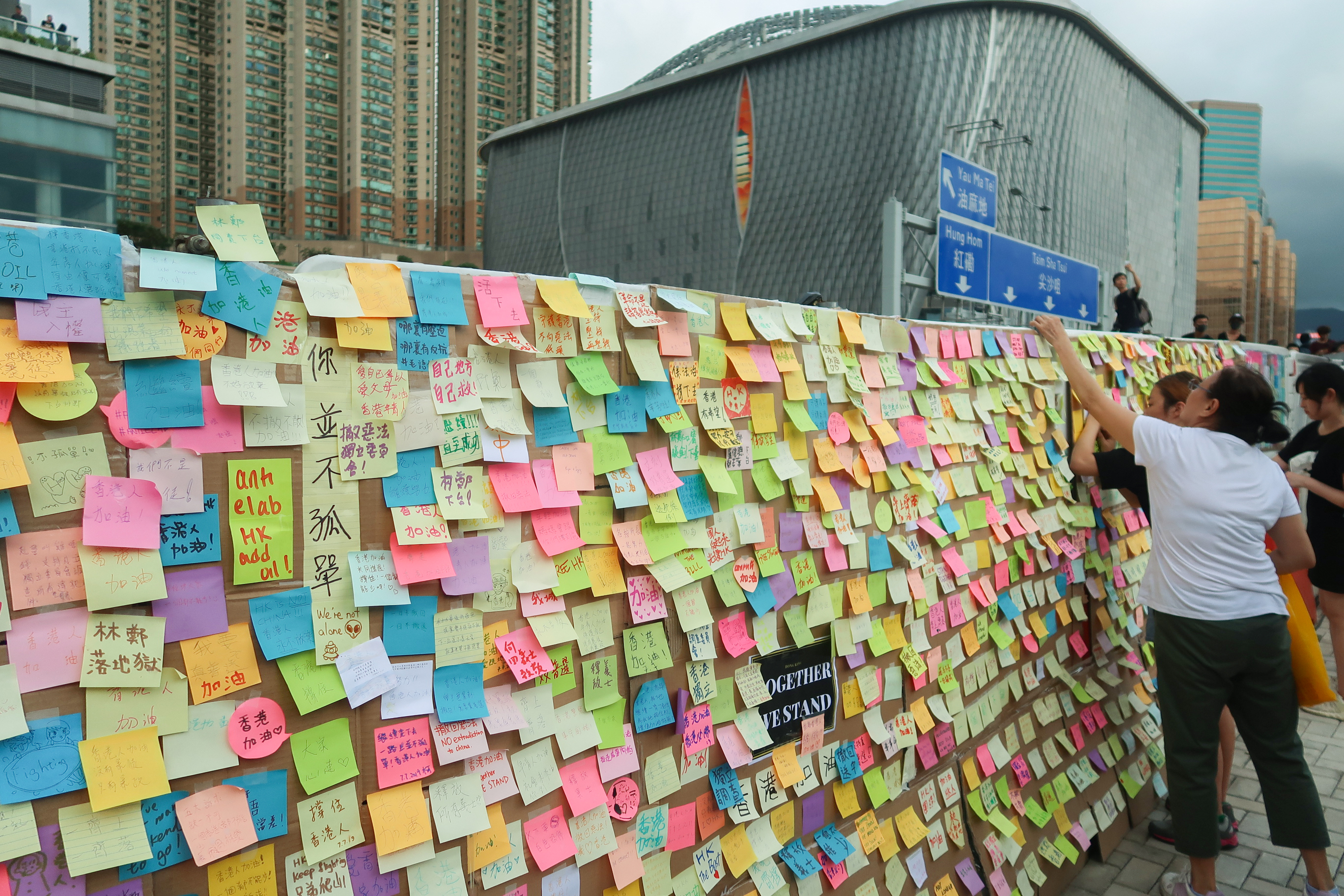
After demonstrations, democracy activists set up a Lennon Wall near Austin Station, 9 July 2019

Inspired by the Lennon Wall in Prague, Czech Republic, a banner reading "Lennon Wall Hong Kong" was set on the outside wall of an Admiralty district staircase, turning the wall into one of the landmarks of the occupied district. The original Lennon Wall was set up in front of the Hong Kong Central Government Offices staircase. During June and July 2019, Lennon Walls covered with colourful post-it messages about freedom and democracy "blossomed everywhere" (遍地開花), appearing throughout the city. They are typically found on the walls of underpasses and pedestrian bridges, on shopfronts, and inside government offices. Protesters have also plastered protest posters, derivative works, and illustrations on Lennon Walls to spread awareness. Pictures of police brutality were highlighted to broadcast the protesters' interpretation of the events. Protesters used post-it notes to create Chinese characters and diagrams. For the protesters, the Lennon Walls serve as a symbol of hope and support between like-minded individuals. After the passing of the Hong Kong national security law on 30 June 2020, notes on Lennon Walls were replaced by blank notes to maintain a form of protest that was not punishable by the law.

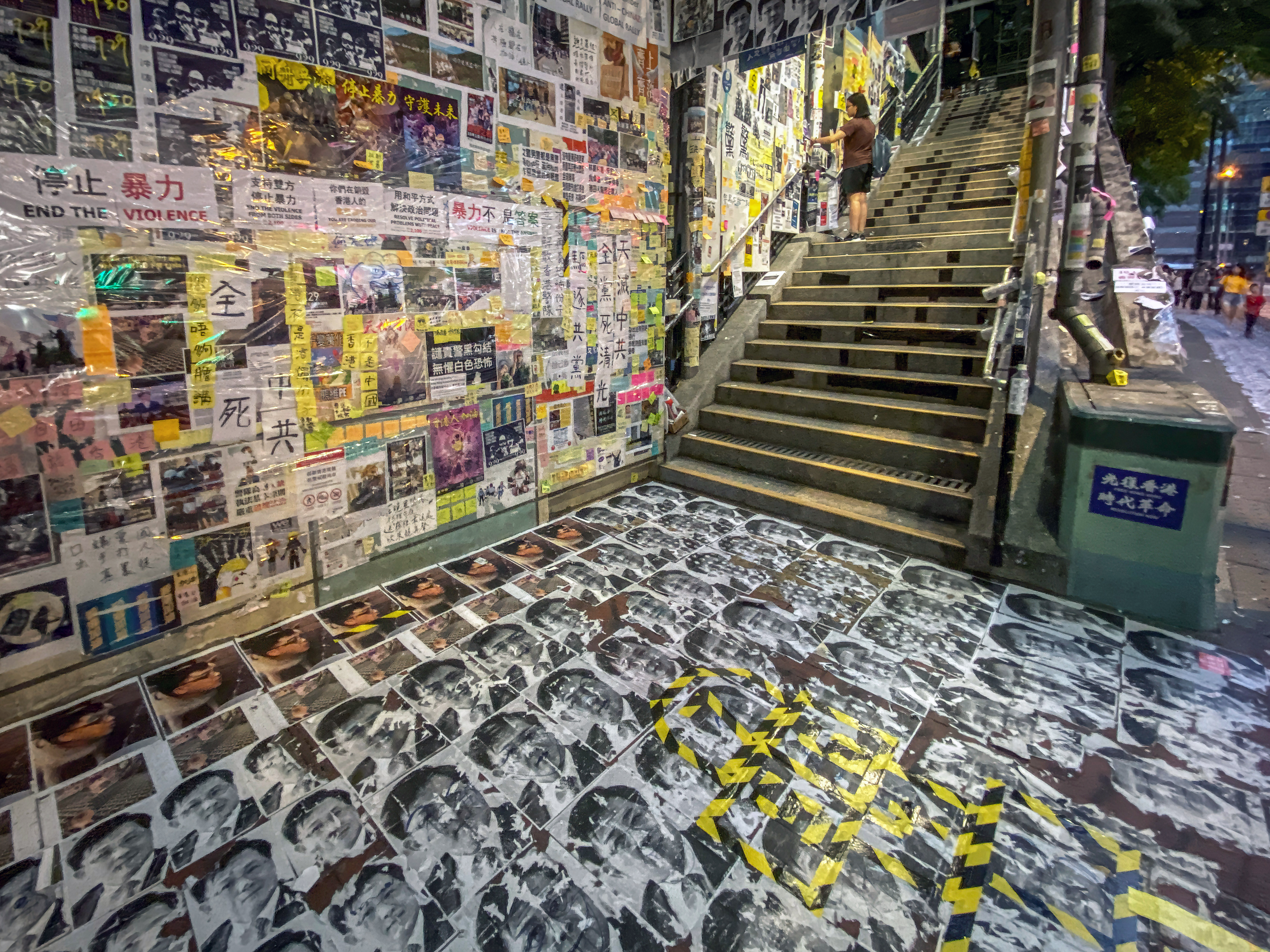
Portraits of pro-Beijing lawmaker Junius Ho plastered on the ground near a Lennon Wall.

Hundreds of portraits of key government supporters and officials were plastered on the ground on footbridges and underpasses, allowing pedestrians to step on them as a way to vent their anger. On some Lennon Walls, citizens can use a slipper hung by protesters to strike the portrait in a manner that resembles something called "villain hitting". Areas near Lennon Walls became sites for art exhibitions; protest art was pasted on the wall, the ground, and/or roofs. Lennon Walls led to conflicts between pro-democracy and pro-Beijing citizens, some of whom attempted to tear messages off the walls and physically assaulted pro-democracy activists. Police removed officers' personal information from a wall in Tai Po. Protesters declared they would put up hundreds more Lennon Walls for each one removed (撕一貼百). To prevent walls from being torn down easily, protesters covered them with sheets of transparent plastic. During marches, some protesters turned themselves into "Lennon Man" as other protesters stuck post-it notes on their clothes. Lennon Walls can also be commonly seen in shops supporting the yellow economic circle. According to a crowd-sourced map of Hong Kong, there are over 150 Lennon Walls throughout the region. Messages of solidarity for the movement have been added to the original Lennon Wall in Prague. Lennon Walls have also appeared in Toronto, Vancouver, Tokyo, Taipei, Berlin, London, Manchester, Melbourne, Sydney, and Auckland.

As the protests started to fade during the COVID-19 pandemic, graffiti, Lennon Walls, and posters were removed and torn down by cleaners contracted by the government. Despite this, marks of the protests remained largely visible and indelible. Several artists started a campaign named "Paper Over the Cracks", in which they used tapes of different color to frame the government's repair work. One of the initiators, Giraffe Leung added that the repair work was a "half-hearted" effort and that "the government is cleaning up are only on the surface, they have little intention to solve the underlying issues". The campaign aimed at reminding Hong Kong people the importance of the protests, despite its significance fading away during the pandemic period.

=== Protest graffiti ===
Graffiti is considered as uncivil disobedience, but a method of communication to express dismay which is restricted verbally under the Hong Kong National Security Law. Commentators consider graffiti walls as uncivil disobedience and questions whether such a method is justified in seeking the government's response to the Anti-Extradition Law Bill. It is suggested that graffiti paintings are random and without specific form and structure, but would influence an individual into collective actions. Consistency in the graffiti's theme, style and textual expressions elevate the sense of solidarity, and it emphasises the responsibility in engaging in resistance as a Hongkonger. There is an underlying message in the graffiti which would link one's opinion to another person's similar opinion. Graffitiing is a sign of delegitimising the government and the police force, as they have lost their power to control and limit public spaces for giving opinions. It is also sign of 'act of resistance' because the painter aims to regain power which has been taken away by the government. The goal of requesting for change is delivered through graffitis, and is a way in seeking communications with the government and opposing parties.

=== Protest mascots ===
The LIHKG website pig and dog (a Shiba Inu) became the protests' unofficial mascots; these ideographs were conceived as emoticons to celebrate the beginning of the year of the dog and year of the pig and quickly gained popularity as LIHKG, a Reddit-like Internet forum, became a key communication channel for protesters.

An internet meme based around the character Pepe the Frog has been widely used as a symbol of liberty and resistance, and has gained international media attention. Protesters created WhatsApp stickers showing the character dressed in protesters' attire, turning it into a pro-democracy everyman that quickly gained popularity as the protests' unofficial mascot. Many other versions, such as Pepe in riot police uniforms or as Carrie Lam have been created. While the character is typically associated with far-right ideology and was viewed as a hate symbol in the US, Pepe has a different reputation in Hong Kong, of being the expressive "sad/smug/funny/angry/resigned frog." With Pepe being so "rehabilitated," the character's creator Matt Furie expressed his delight about the cartoon frog's new role, writing "This is great news! Pepe for the People!".

Several Hong Kong bakeries adopted the mascots as options with which customers can choose to decorate their cakes. They were also made into toys and sprayed as graffiti.

Protesters crowdfunded a 4-metre (13 ft) tall pro-democracy statue named Lady Liberty Hong Kong. The statue's design originates from the reverse delivery demonstrator's costume. The statue is clothed in a yellow helmet, eye mask, and respirator; its right hand holds an umbrella and the left a flag that reads, "Liberate Hong Kong, revolution of our times".

=== Flags and symbols ===
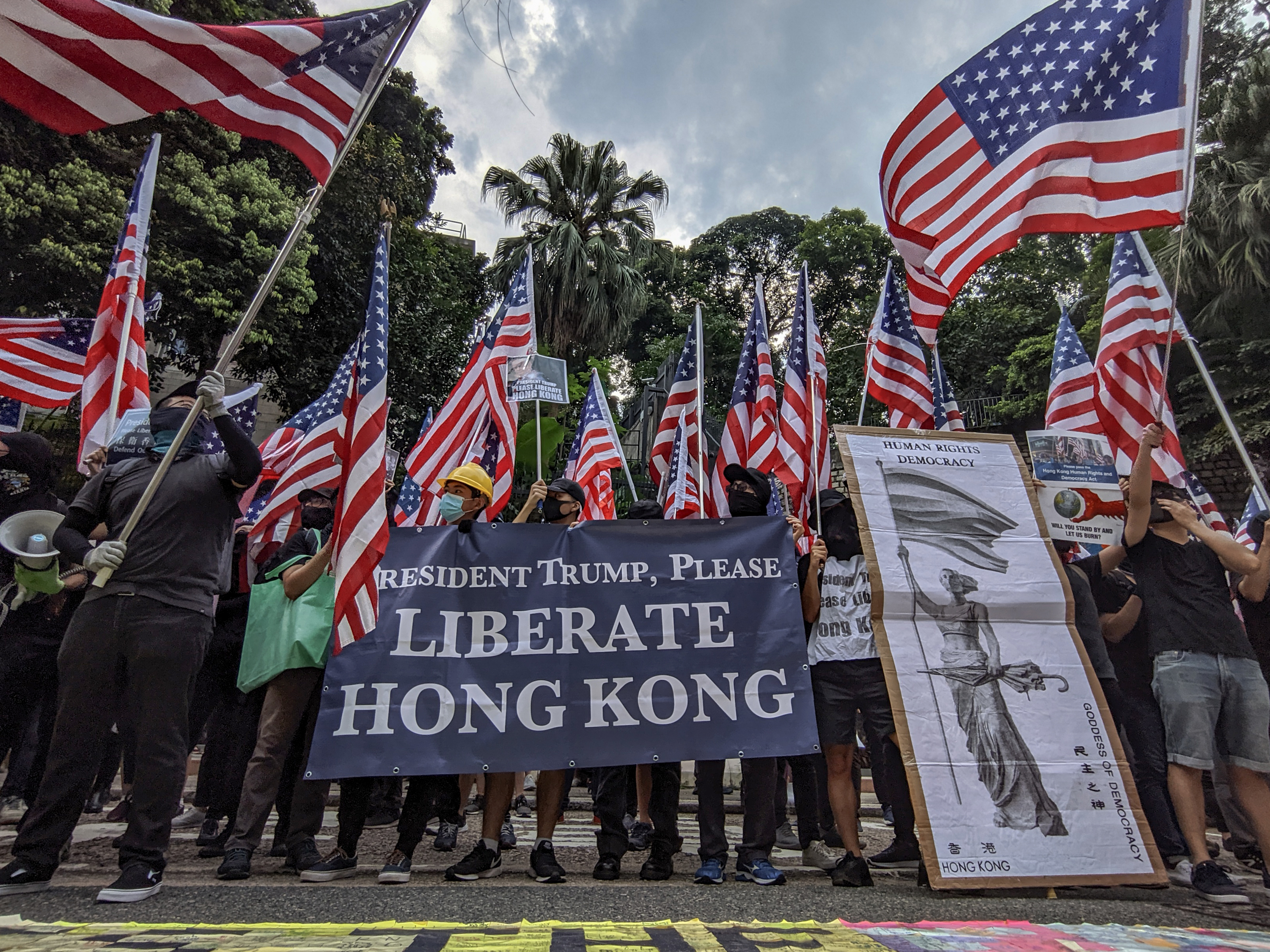
Hong Kong protestors with United States flags

Some protesters waved the flag of the United States in support of the prospective introduction of the Hong Kong Human Rights and Democracy Act, a bill proposed by the US Congress. Others waved the flags of the United Kingdom, the Republic of China (Taiwan), and South Africa. The Dragon and Lion flag used by Hong Kong during the colonial era was also seen during the protests, though its use has often been criticised. Some protestors, claiming inspiration from the Ukrainian Revolution in 2014, have also waved the Ukrainian flag. Another that frequently appears is the Estelada, the unofficial flag of Catalonia's independence movement, which has been a source of inspiration; parallel rallies expressing solidarity between the movements have been held in the two regions.

Protesters created a version of the regional Hong Kong flag depicting a wilted or bloodied bauhinia flower. A black and white version of the Hong Kong flag, referred to as "Black Bauhinia", has also been seen in protests.

Badiucao, a Chinese cartoonist and political dissident, designed a number of poster images of those harmed in the protests, such as one of Carrie Lam wearing a necklace with a dangling ear, a ring with an eyeball inset; a Bruce Lee-inspired "Be Water" image; the Lennon Wall Flag, a symbol of Hong Kong's pro-democracy movement. According to him, the flag was inspired by the Lennon Wall in Hong Kong. It consists of 96 coloured squares that symbolise the post-it notes on the walls: The number 96 represents 1996, the year before the handover of Hong Kong. "Every colour on the flag is a different voice. And every individual voice deserves its place in Hong Kong," he said.

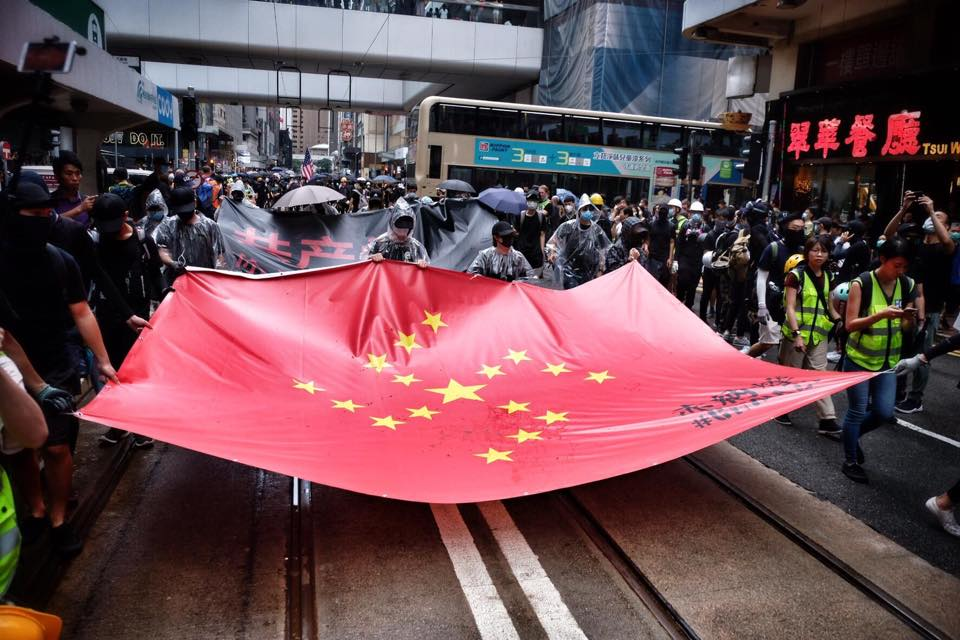
"Chinazi" flag during protest in August 2019

The "Chinazi" (赤納粹) flag — a blend of "China" and "Nazi" — was created by combining the flag of the People's Republic of China and that of the Nazi Party to draw comparisons between the Chinese and the 1933–1945 German Nazi governments. Variations include golden stars forming a Nazi swastika on a red background and Nazi swastikas replacing the golden stars on the Chinese flag. American journalist and political commentator Nicholas Kristof mentioned graffiti in Hong Kong using the 'Chinazi' label to denounce the influence of the Chinese government, he reported in The New York Times.

Pro-Beijing counter-protesters used the Chinese national flag as their main symbol. Several Hong Kong and mainland celebrities declared themselves "flag protectors" after protesters threw several Chinese flags into the sea in August 2019.

Black Bauhinia flag

"Liberate Hong Kong" banner

"Chinazi" flag

"Free Hong Kong" flag

=== Hill-top vertical protest banners ===
In a manner similar to what happened during the Umbrella Revolution, activists scaled the Lion Rock, an iconic natural landmark overlooking Kowloon that carries with it Hong Kong's special identity and displayed massive vertical protest banners. In June 2019, the League of Social Democrats (LSD) displayed a banner denouncing the extradition bill. On 20 August that year, another group of protesters pinned a banner reading "Oppose institutional violence, I want true universal suffrage" on the mountain; the banner was removed by firefighters. The statue Lady Liberty Hong Kong was displayed on the top of Lion Rock on 14 October before being dismantled by pro-Beijing activists the following day. Other banners were displayed on Beacon Hill, Devil's Peak, and Kowloon Peak.

=== Lights display ===
The use of laser pointers gained popularity following the arrest of HKBU's Student Union president Fong Chung-yin. On 7 August 2019, a group of protesters gathered at Hong Kong Space Museum and shone laser pointers on a wall of the museum; some chanted slogans like "laser pointer revolution" and joked "Is the building on fire yet?". The laser rally was held after the police concluded laser pointers are "offensive weapons" that can cause fire. Some protesters displayed Star Wars lightsaber toys to mock the police's description of laser pointers as "laser guns".

During the Hong Kong Way human chain campaign and the Mid-autumn festival period, hikers and trail runners scaled Lion Rock and shone lights at the city using cellphone flashlights and laser pointers. During a #MeToo rally in August 2019, protesters shone purple flashlights using their phones to show their support for the victims.

=== Protest masks and handicrafts ===
Protesters began folding origami cranes named "freenix" (自由鳥), viewed as a symbol of peace and hope. During the Mid-autumn festival, Hong Kong residents crafted lanterns bearing messages encouraging the protesters.

After the government implemented a ban on face masks using the Emergency Regulations Ordinance, protesters continued to wear masks in rallies and protests. In addition to common surgical masks, protesters wore masks depicting Chief Executive Carrie Lam, China's Paramount leader Xi Jinping, and cartoon characters such as Pepe the Frog and Winnie the Pooh, which was banned in China after internet users compared Xi's likeness with Disney's depiction of A.A. Milne's character. Protesters wore the smiling Guy Fawkes masks depicted in the graphic novel V for Vendetta, which has become an inspiration and the mask regarded as an anti-authoritarian symbol. For a march on Human Rights Day, 8 December 2019, a group of activists led by Simon Lau joined the crowds wearing colourful masks featuring Pepe, a pig, a and shiba inu. Over a 10-day period, Lau's team cast 117 oversized fibreglass masks, each bearing "a story of Hong Kong people's suffering".

== Performing arts ==
=== Music ===
==== Pop songs ====
Hong Kongers have also composed several pieces of original music. Local rappers and bands have released songs that criticise the government and the police. The ninth-most-popular music video on YouTube in the city was a protest theme named "Wo Nei Fei" (和你飛), which has an introspective tone and focuses on the depression and exhaustion protesters have faced during the protests. The lyrics urge protesters to stay united in a time of difficulty. The song's name alludes to the July 2019 sit-in at Hong Kong International Airport that was named "Fly with you", itself a wordplay of "peaceful, rational and non-violent protesters". A remix of Sia's song "Chandelier" titled "Fat Mama Has Something To Say" (肥媽有話兒) quickly gained local attention. It was remixed using a speech given by Maria Cordero at a pro-police rally, edited, rearranged and auto-tuned to bend her pitch to the song, with the lyrics replaced with anti-police rhetoric.

Singer-songwriter Charmaine Fong released her own composition, "Explicit Comment (人話)" in late 2019. Its lyrics expressed her stance toward the anti-government protests explicitly. Although the music video stirred controversy with its extensive use of protest footage featuring scenes of police brutality, it was highly popular upon release, attracting more than 400,000 views by the second day of release. It was viewed a million times after one month, and earned Fong a distinction in an online poll as favourite singer and favourite song.

==== Musical ====
"Do You Hear the People Sing", the unofficial anthem of the Umbrella Movement in 2014, was commonly sung during the protest. It was also sung by pro-democracy audience during a friendly football game between Manchester City and Kitchee on 24 July at Hong Kong Stadium to obscure the playing of the Chinese national anthem and to raise foreign awareness of the situation in the city. Though the version and context of "Do You Hear the People Sing" sung in the protests is not completely identical to the version of the musical and the book written by Victor Hugo, it is noted by commentators that the song is still very applicable to the protests because protestors are similarly demanding the government to listen to the voices of "angry men" in granting them freedom and democracy.

==== Anthems ====
A group of anonymous composers wrote the song "Glory to Hong Kong" (願榮光歸香港), which became a theme of the protest and was regarded as the city's unofficial national anthem by protestors. This significance of this 'anthem' is to unify Hong Kongers and to boost public morale in spite of months of protests going on. The lyrics of the anthem hinted and amplified the events that happened during the few months, such as mass demonstrations and police brutality. The marching style and nature of the song and the rich orchestral background music emphasize the determinations of Hong Kongers to achieve democracy and wanting the government to respond to the 5 demands. Composed by Thomas dgx, the song has since been translated into several languages. Its lyrics, include the phrase "Liberate Hong Kong, the revolution of our time", were mainly written by users of LIHKG. The song's music video includes demonstration scenes and was uploaded to YouTube on 31 August 2019. Several covers, including a Cantonese opera rendition, were released. A version featuring a 150-person orchestra became YouTube's most viewed music video in 2019 in Hong Kong. On 10 September 2019, supporters sang the song at a football match for the first time during a FIFA World Cup qualification match against Iran. On the same night, the song was publicly sung at more than a dozen shopping malls across Hong Kong.

Protesters have also sung the British national anthem "God Save the Queen" and the American national anthem "The Star-Spangled Banner," while demonstrating outside those countries' consulates-general to appeal to their governments for help.

==== Religious music ====
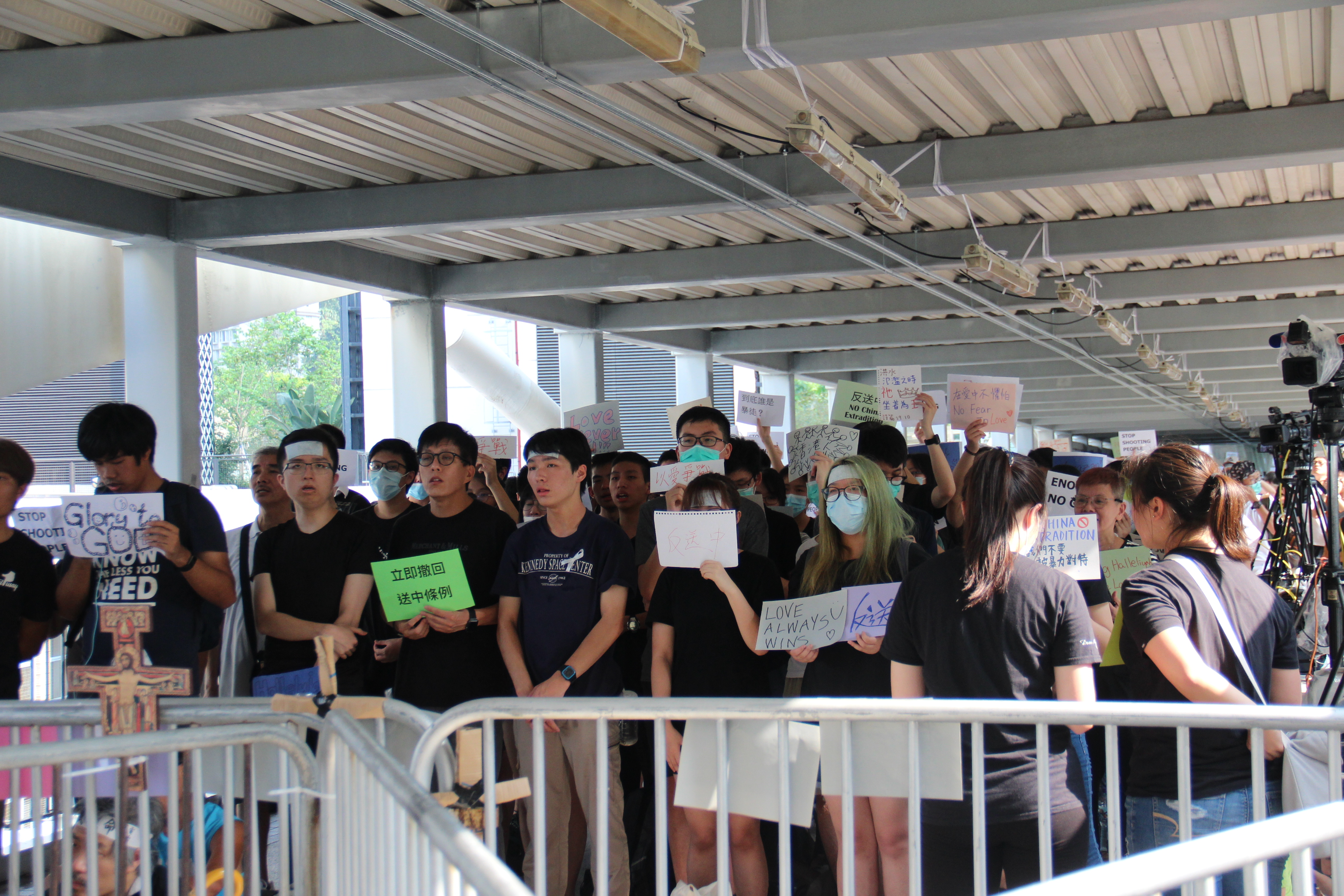
A group of Christians singing "Sing Hallelujah to the Lord" near the Central Government Complex, June 2019

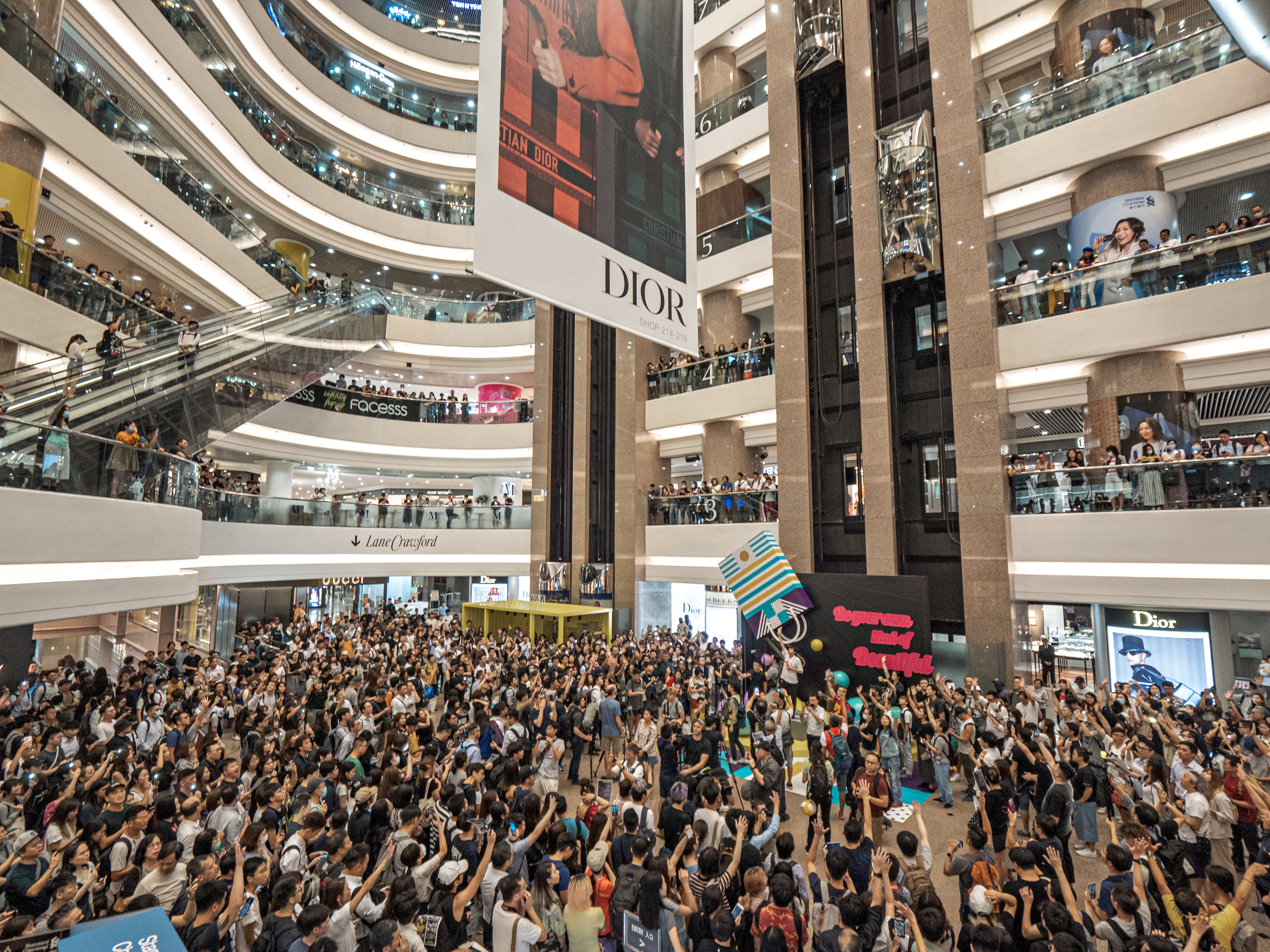
People singing "Glory to Hong Kong" at Times Square, Causeway Bay, September 2019

A 1974 Christian hymn called "Sing Hallelujah to the Lord" became the "unofficial anthem" of the anti-extradition protests and was heard at many protest sites. On 11 June 2019, a group of Christians began to sing the four-line-verse and simple melody at the Central Government Complex as they held a public prayer meeting the night before the Legislative Council was scheduled to begin the second reading of the extradition bill. On the morning of 12 June, led by pastors, they stood between the crowd and police to help prevent violence and pray for the city with the hymn. Under Hong Kong's Public Order Ordinance, religious gatherings are exempt from the definition of a "gathering" or "assembly" and therefore more difficult to police. The song was sung repeatedly over the course of 10 hours and a video of the event quickly became popular online. Hong Kong's local ministries, many of whom support underground churches in China, supported the protests. Most city churches tend to avoid political involvement but many were worried about the effects of the extradition bill on Christians because mainland China has few religious freedom laws. The hymn "Sing Hallelujah to the Lord" has brought solidarity in Hong Kong people because the hymn grants them support from God. Even non-Christians felt a sense of peace and calmness in the midst of a tense atmosphere.

=== Photography ===
The protests have inspired many of the 33 entries shortlisted for the 2020 Human Rights Art Prize, organised by the Hong Kong Justice Centre in a display at Goethe-Institute. The winning work by photographer Magus Yuen Kam-wa, and entitled "Hong Kong Symposium 2019″ – depicts a flower in a gas canister – examines basic human rights by exploring the impact of tear gas during the protests.

Photographer Ko Chung-ming participated in the 2020 Sony World Photography Awards with a series named Wounds of Hong Kong. The series, which consists of photos of 24 victims of police brutality, highlights the scars and injuries they have sustained during the protests. Ko won the first prize in the award's documentary section.

=== Film ===
A documentary produced by Sue Williams, Denise Ho: Becoming the Song is released on 1 July – the 23rd anniversary of Britain's handover of Hong Kong to China in 1997 – in solidarity with the protest.

Citizens had held community screening for three films: Winter on Fire: Ukraine's Fight for Freedom, Lost in the Fumes and Ten Years. Winter on Fire documents the Ukrainian revolution in 2014, which was often cited as an inspiration for the Hong Kong protesters. Lost in the Fumes follows the story of localist leader Edward Leung before his imprisonment in 2018. The documentary resonated with the protesters as Leung, despite being "another young person in Hong Kong", managed to cause a political awakening for many young people following his election campaign in the 2016 Legislative Council by-election and his participation in the 2016 Mong Kok civil unrest, leading to the rise of localism in Hong Kong. Ten Years is a dystopian speculative fiction anthology film which explores a possible future in Hong Kong in 2025 which sees the city's freedom and human rights being eroded by the Chinese government as it further exerts its influence.

== Legal obstacles ==
Since the passing and commencement of the national security law on 30 June 2020, the future of protest artwork becomes uncertain. The law is aimed to prevent secession, subversion and any other activities which would endanger national security. As China has imposed its own national security law and expressed disapproval for similar productions, similarly, Hong Kong artists that attempt subversion of state power through artworks that spread messages of freedom and democracy could possibly face censorship and be sentenced to jail.

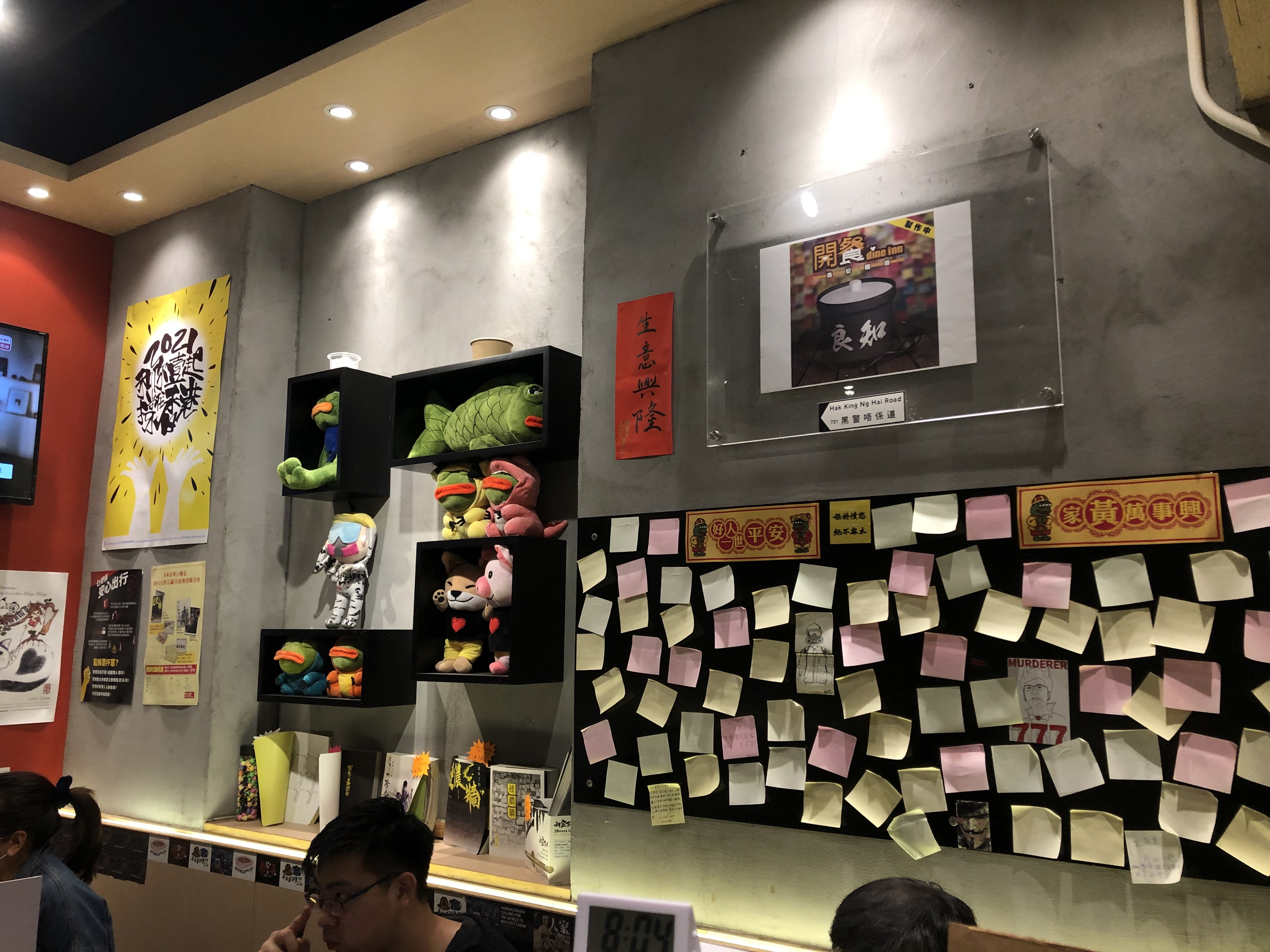
A restaurant in Hong Kong replaced all their post-it messages with empty post-it notes to prevent from prosecution in relation to the national security law, March 2021

Under political pressure, a lot of artists resort to self-censorship and have made plans to leave the city so to restart art creation in countries where freedom of expression and criticism on government is allowed. Other examples of censorship occurring includes, banning pro-democracy book prints within publishing sector, pro-democracy and political books removed from shelves, protest artworks in shops and public spaces have been reluctantly removed, Lennon Walls inside shops were removed. Some kept their Lennon Walls but replaced the messages with empty post-it notes to keep the spirit alive without breaching the law. Protest arts were replaced with blank paper to reflect the "white terror" brought by the law. Remaining pieces of the original Lady Liberty Hong Kong have been transferred to a hidden location, in a café at Sham Shui Po, to avoid unwanted attention while exhibiting the pieces.

In response to public opinions of the government's violations on human rights, the government in its statement rebutted that the law still 'upholds and protects human rights', however, only if artists 'do not contravene the offences as defined under the law'.

== Gallery ==
=== Protest art ===
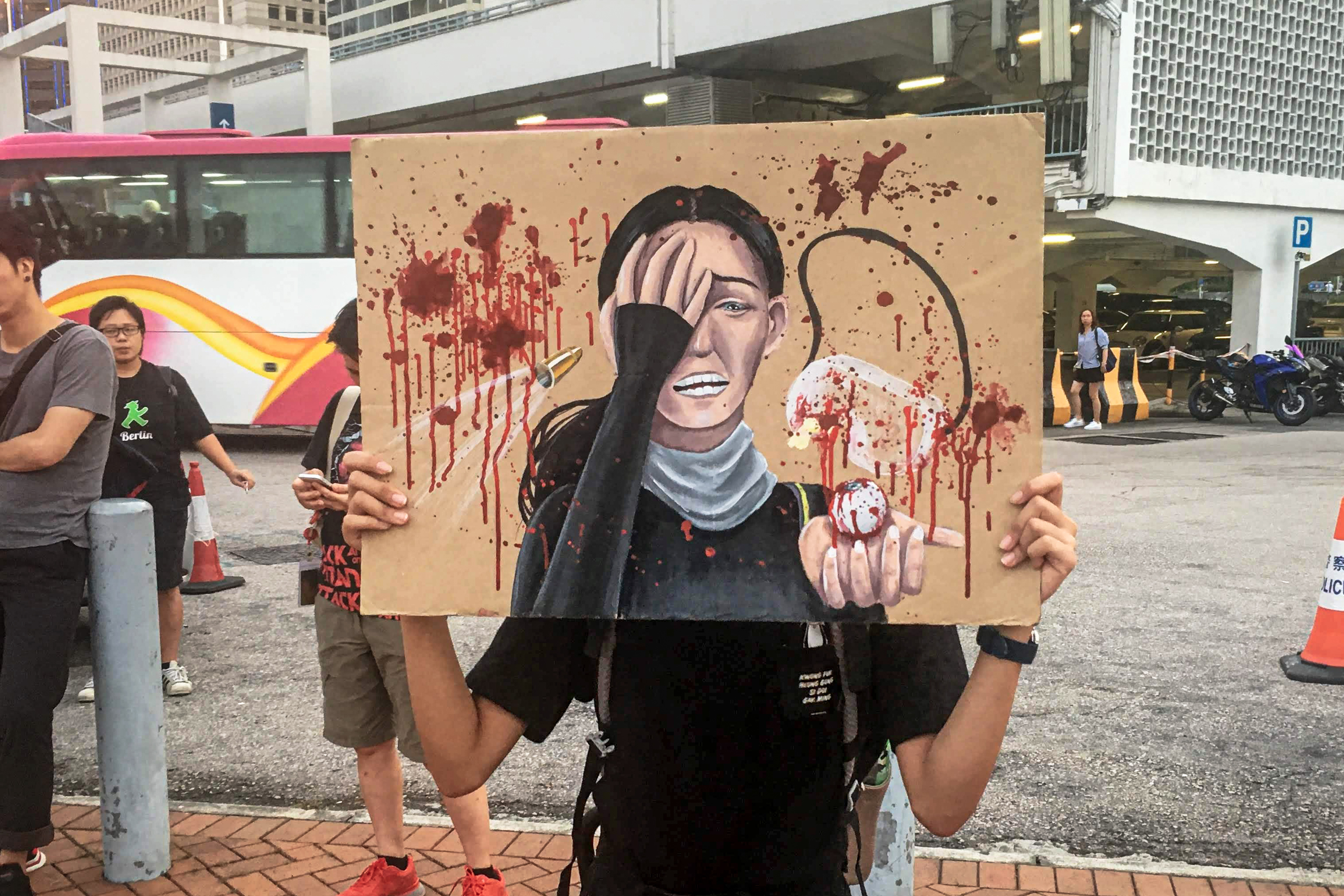
Artwork that alludes to the August 11 incident when a female protester's eye was allegedly injured by a bean-bag round shot by the police

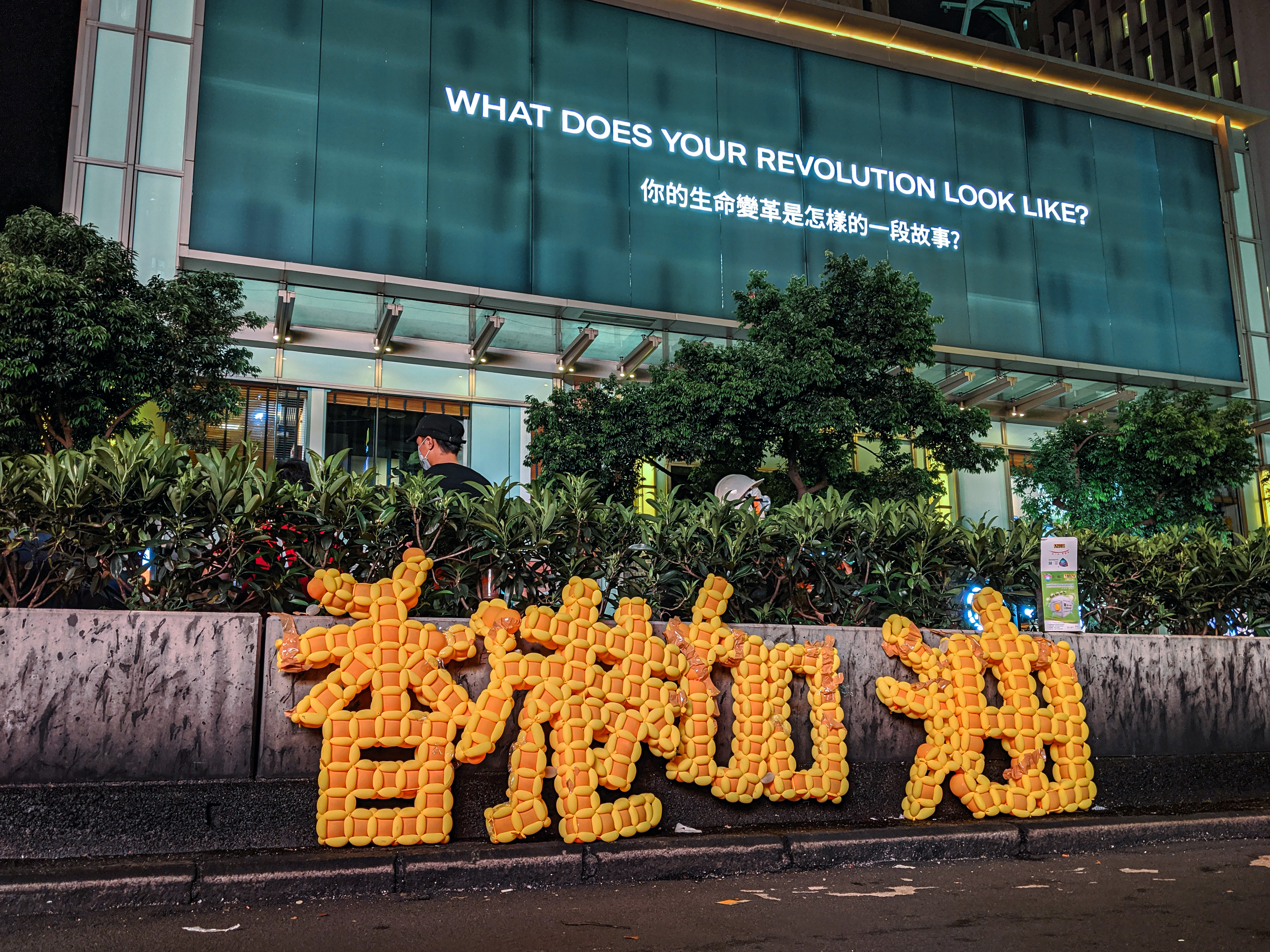
Protest message written using balloon modelling, August 2019

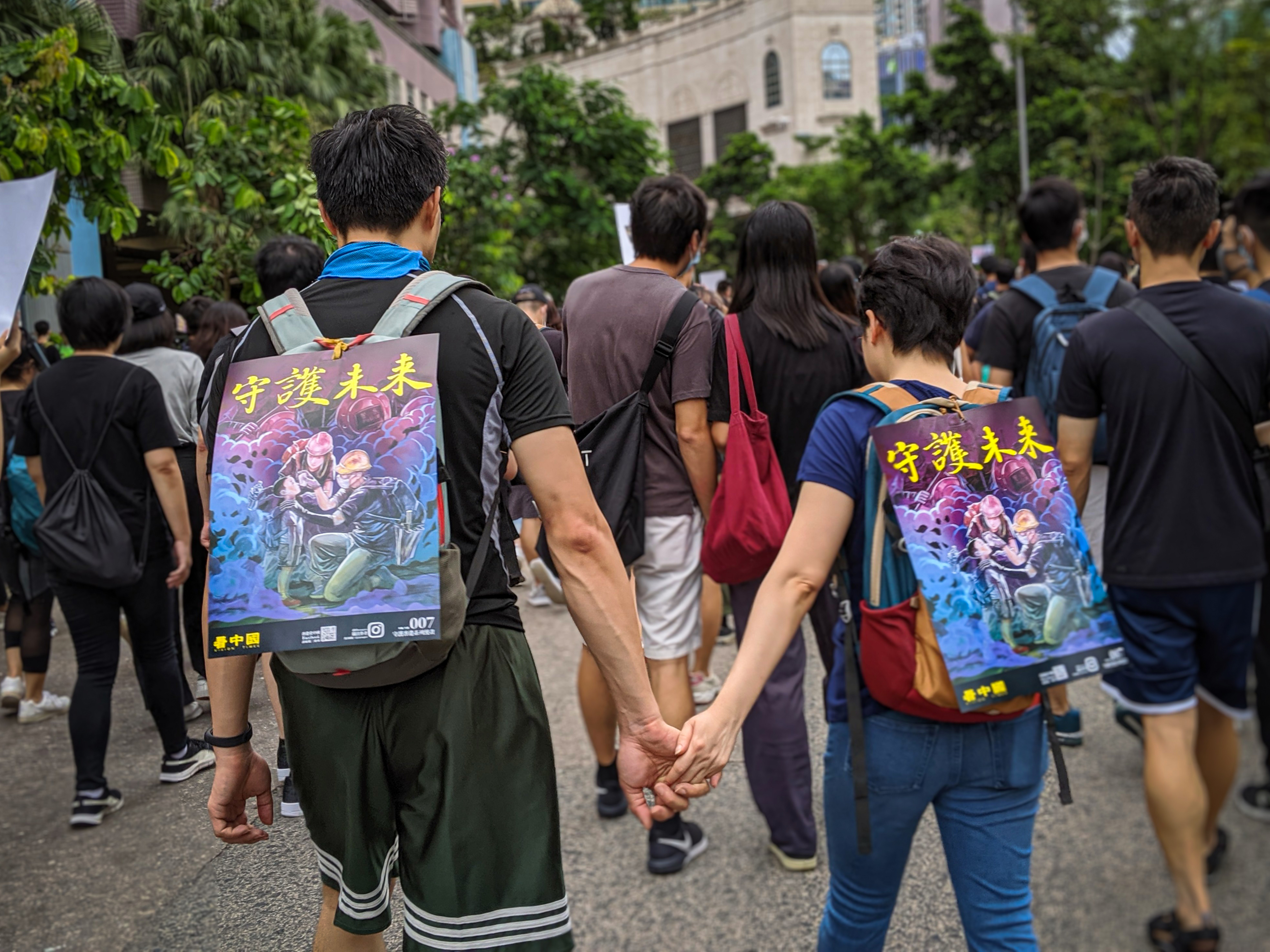
Protest artworks attached to backpacks, August 2019. The Chinese words mean "Guard the future."

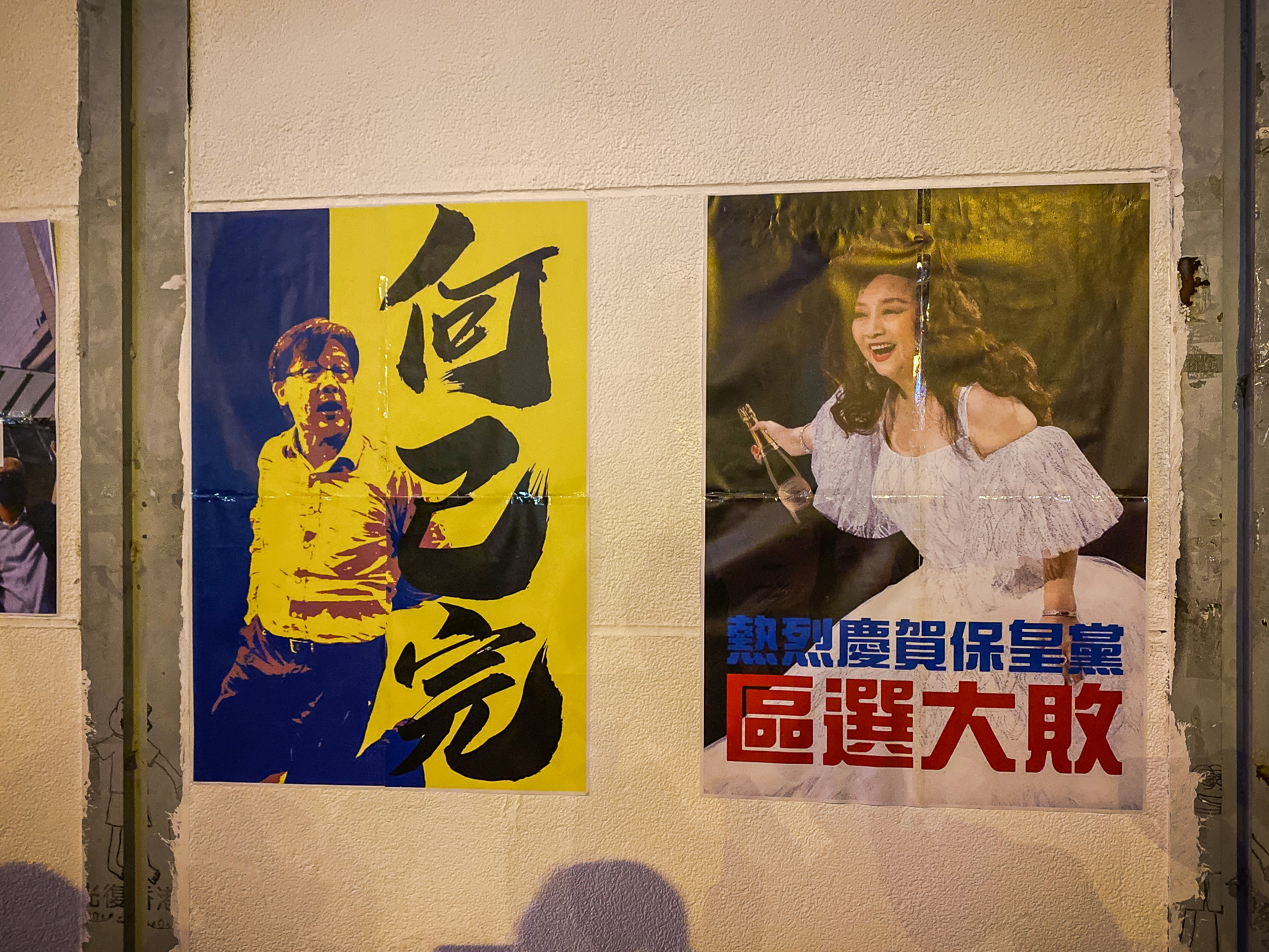
Protesters "celebrating" the pro-Beijing camp's electoral defeat after the 2019 Hong Kong local elections, November 2019

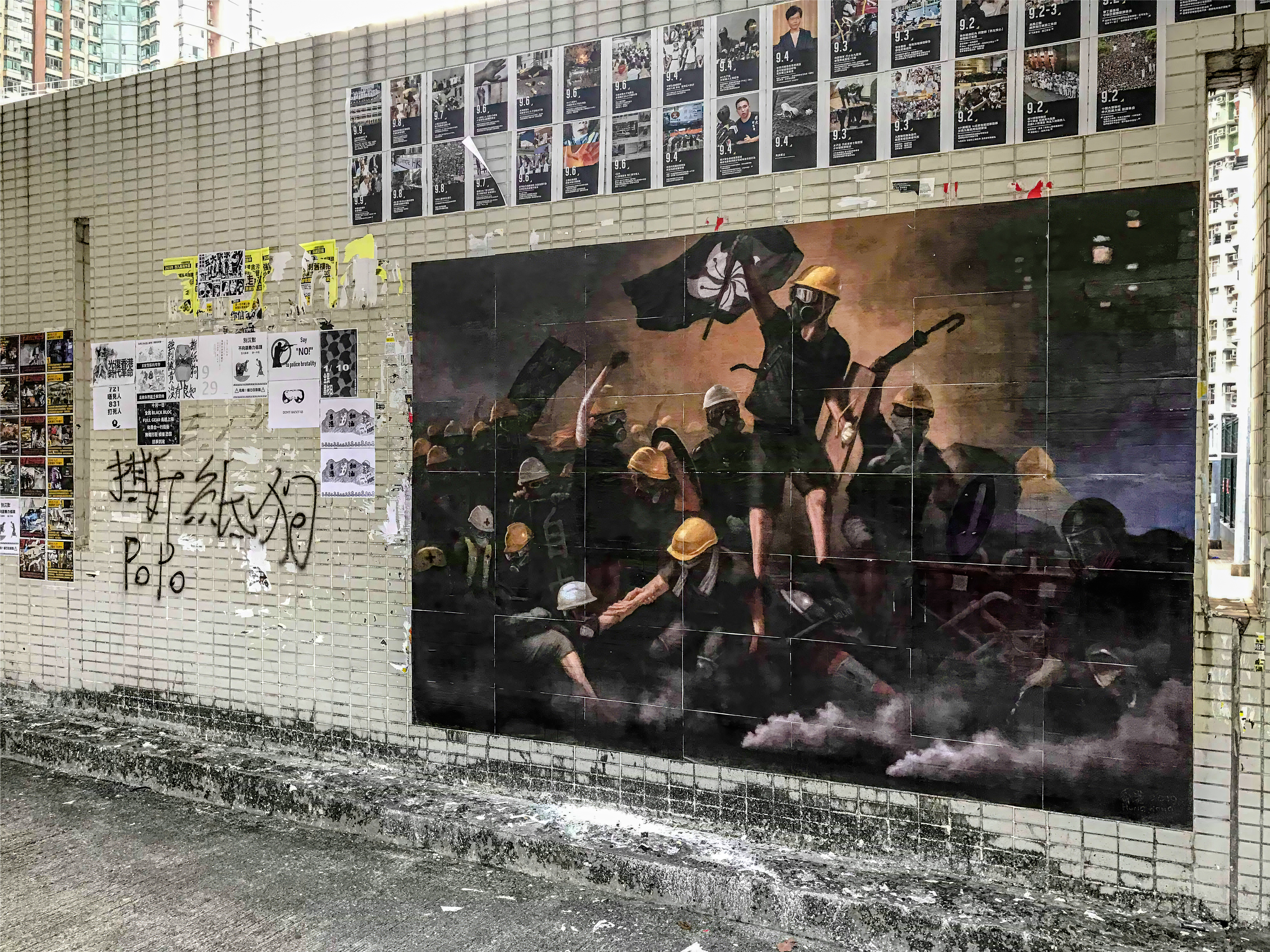
Protest artwork imitating Liberty Leading the People

=== Symbols ===
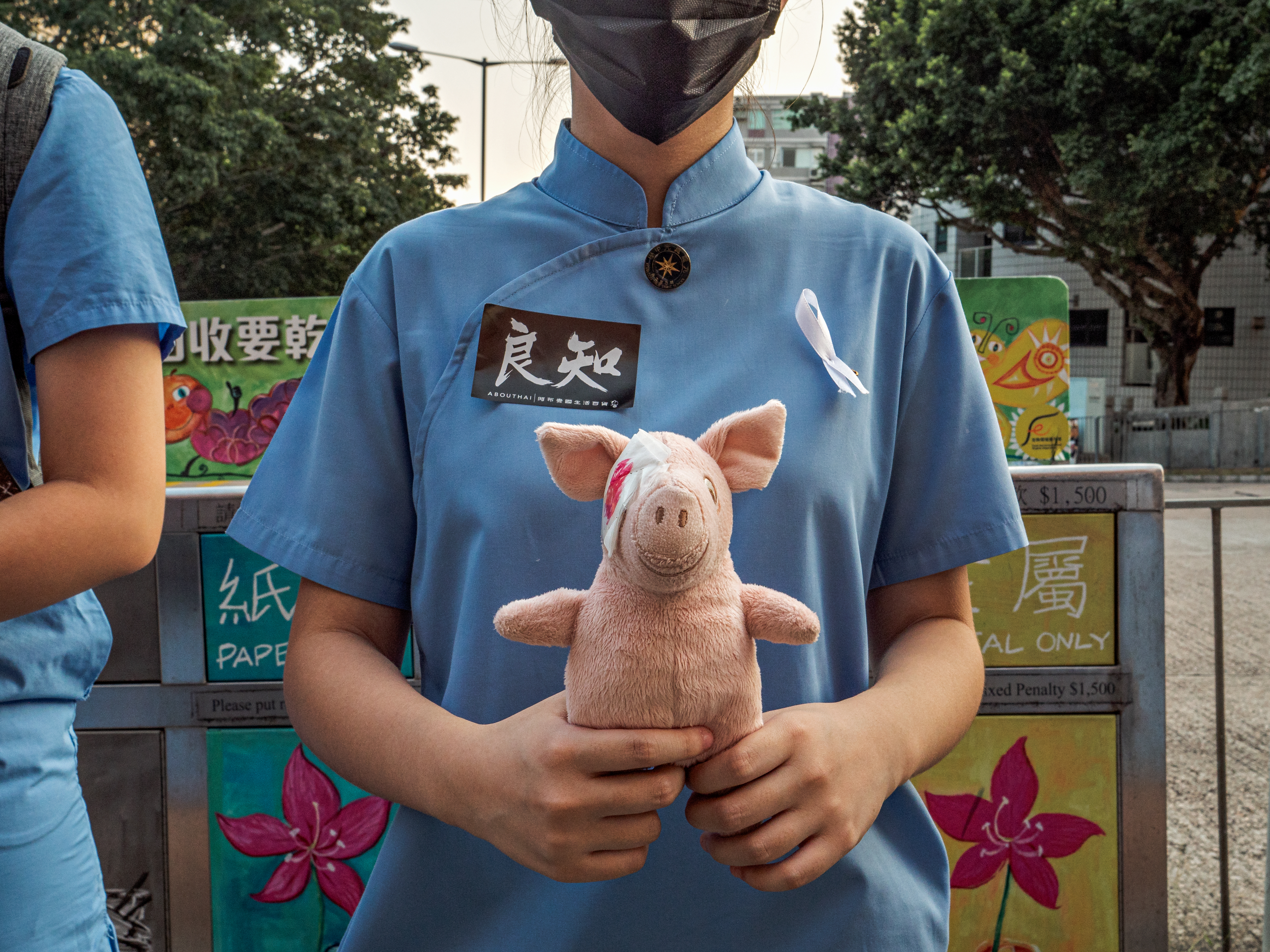
A student holding a LIHKG Pig stuffed animal. The pig's injury alludes to the August 11 incident when a young woman was injured to the eye.

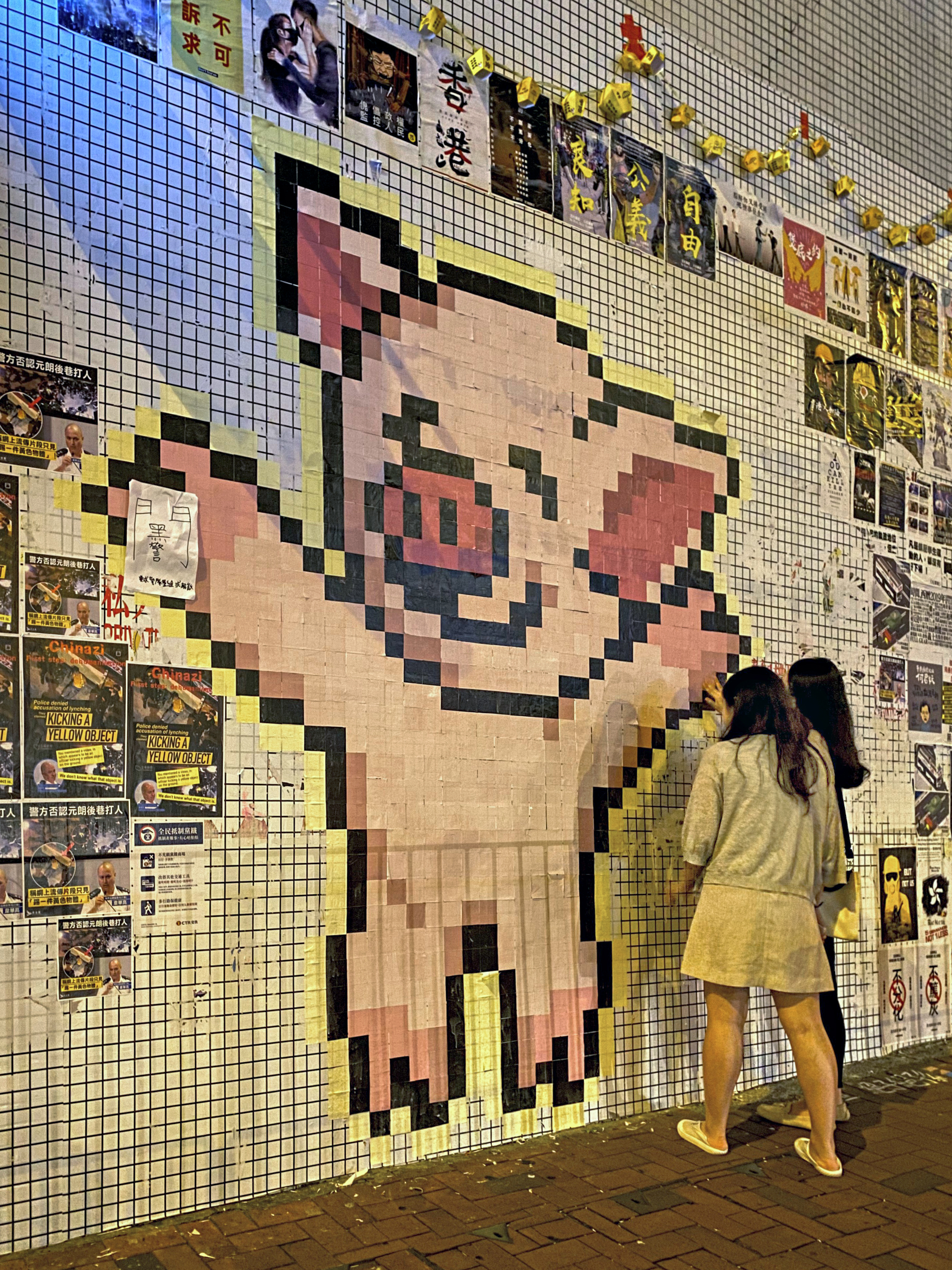
The LIHKG pig on a Lennon Wall.

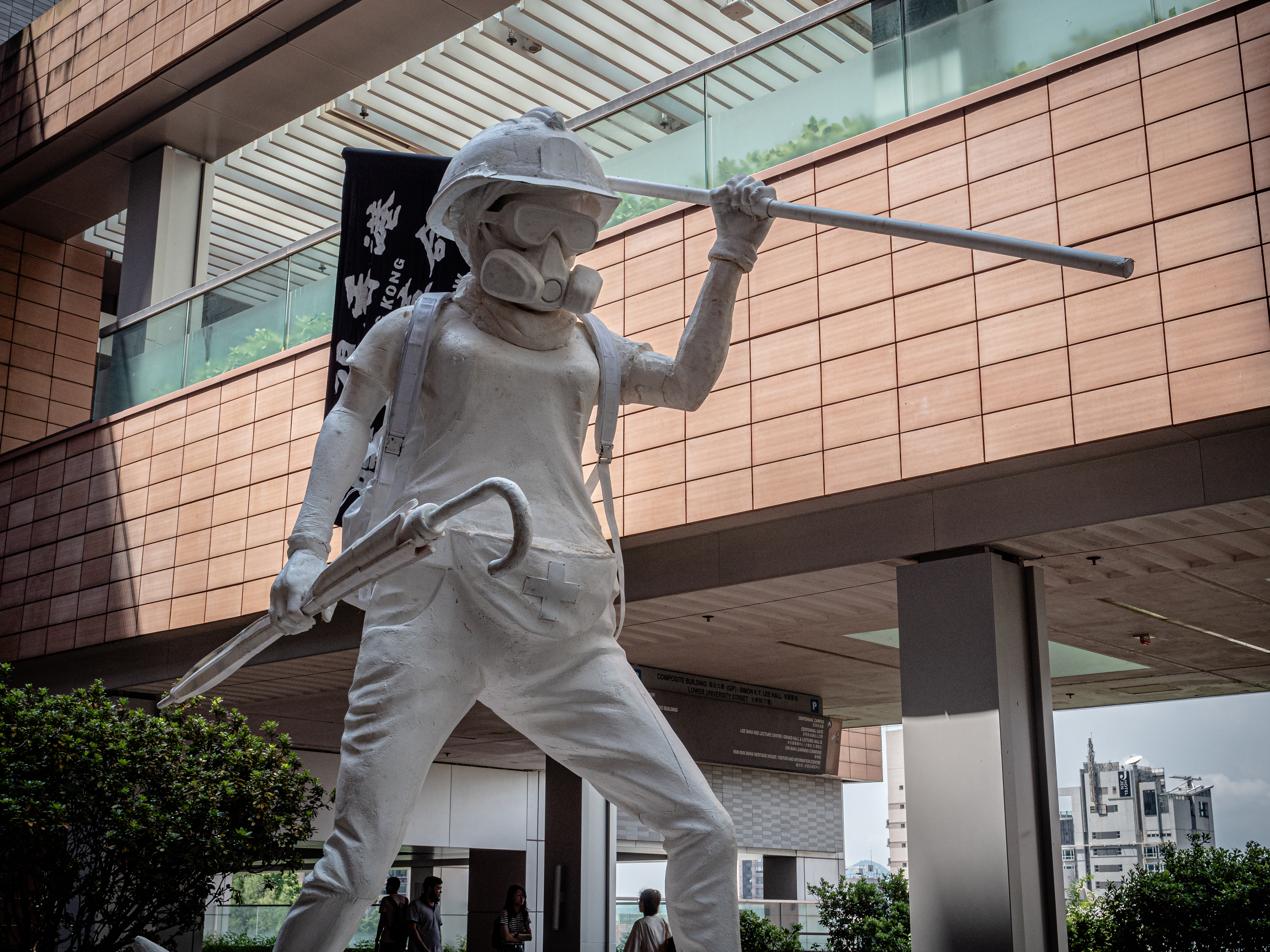
Lady Liberty Hong Kong inside the University of Hong Kong campus, September 2019

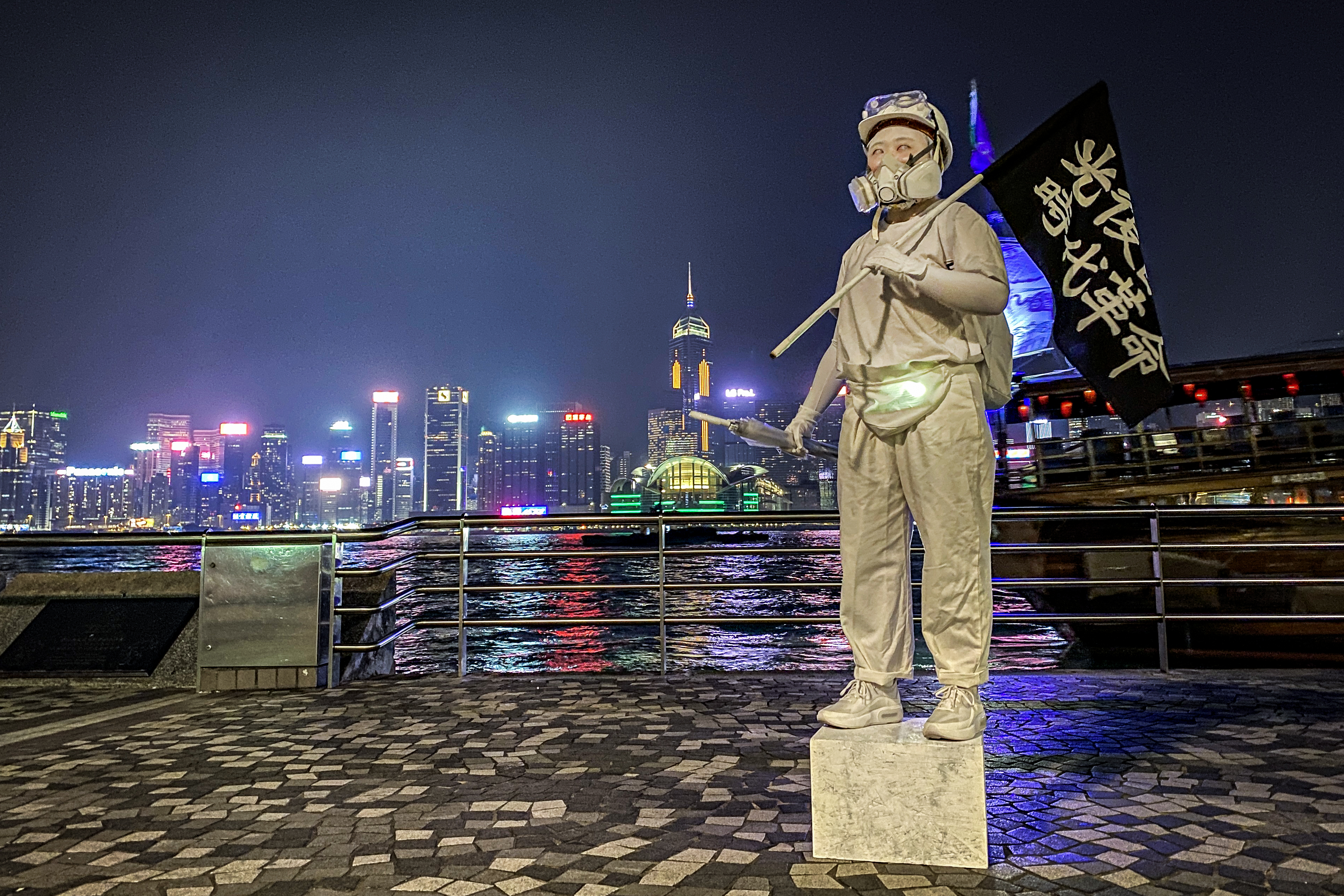
A person cosplaying as the Lady Liberty Hong Kong in Tsim Sha Tsui, October 2019

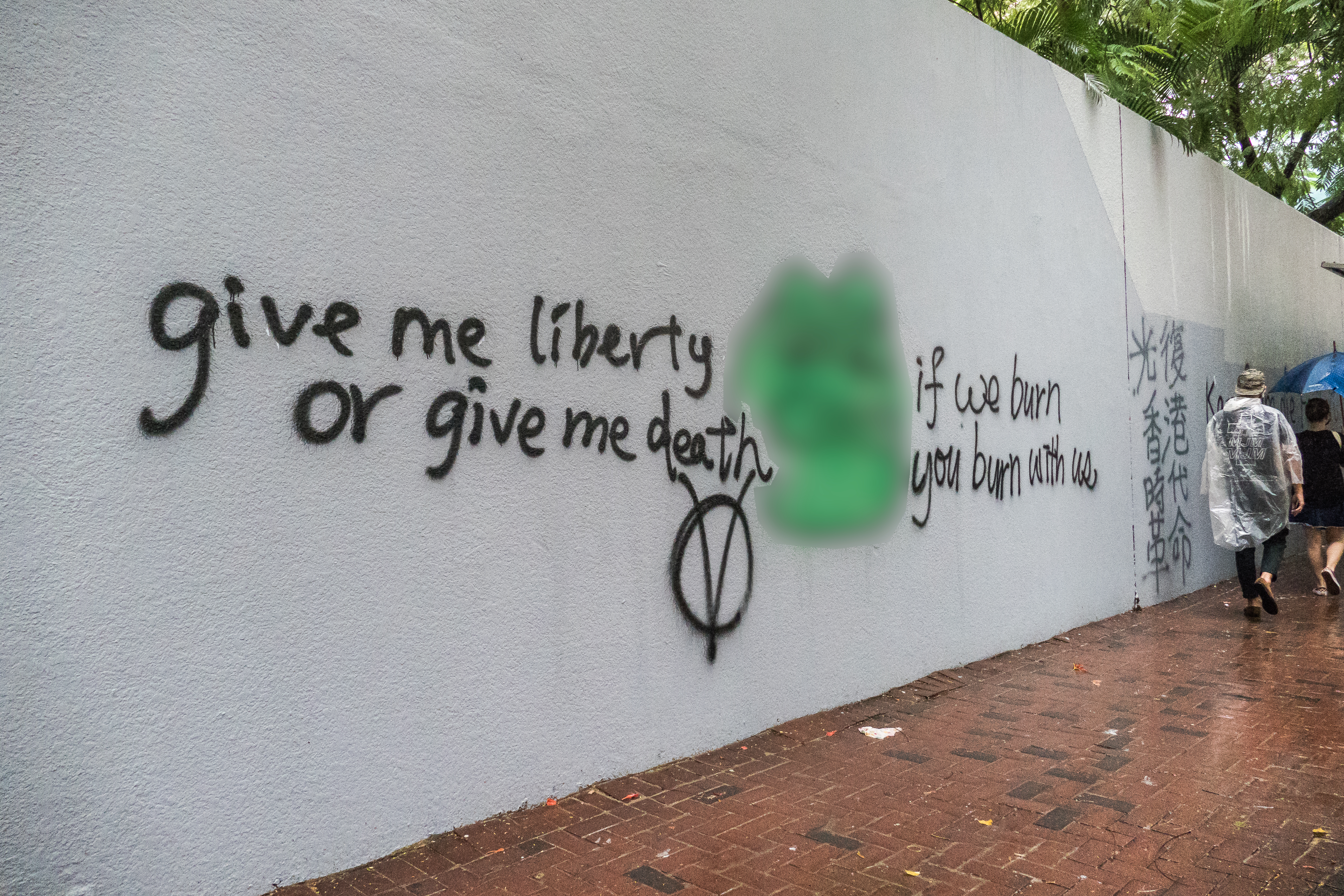
Pepe the Frog as a graffiti alongside the famous quote "Give me liberty or give me death" and a V for Vendetta symbol, October 2019

=== Light displays ===
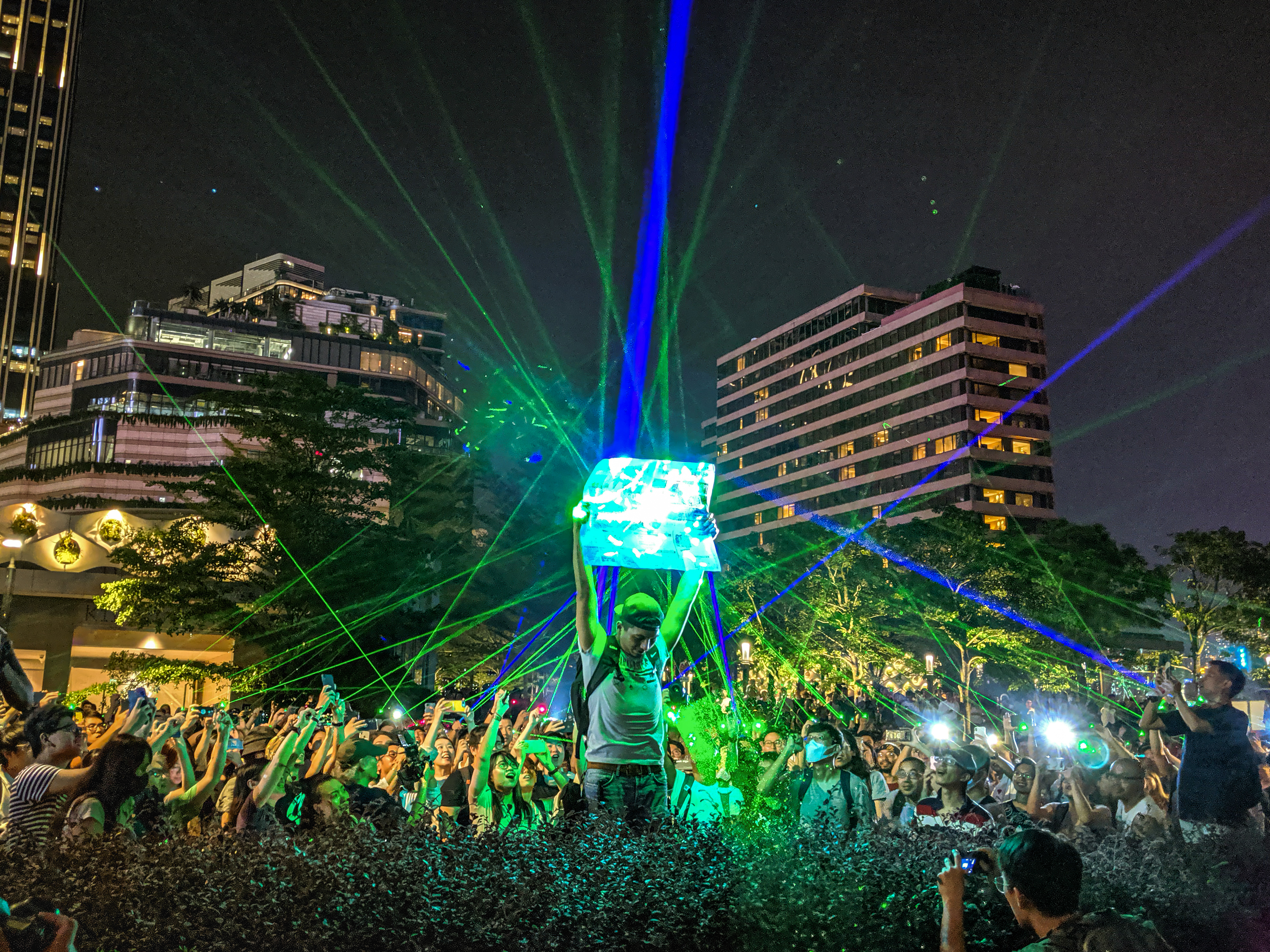
Protesters pointing their laser pointers to a newspaper mocking the police demonstration

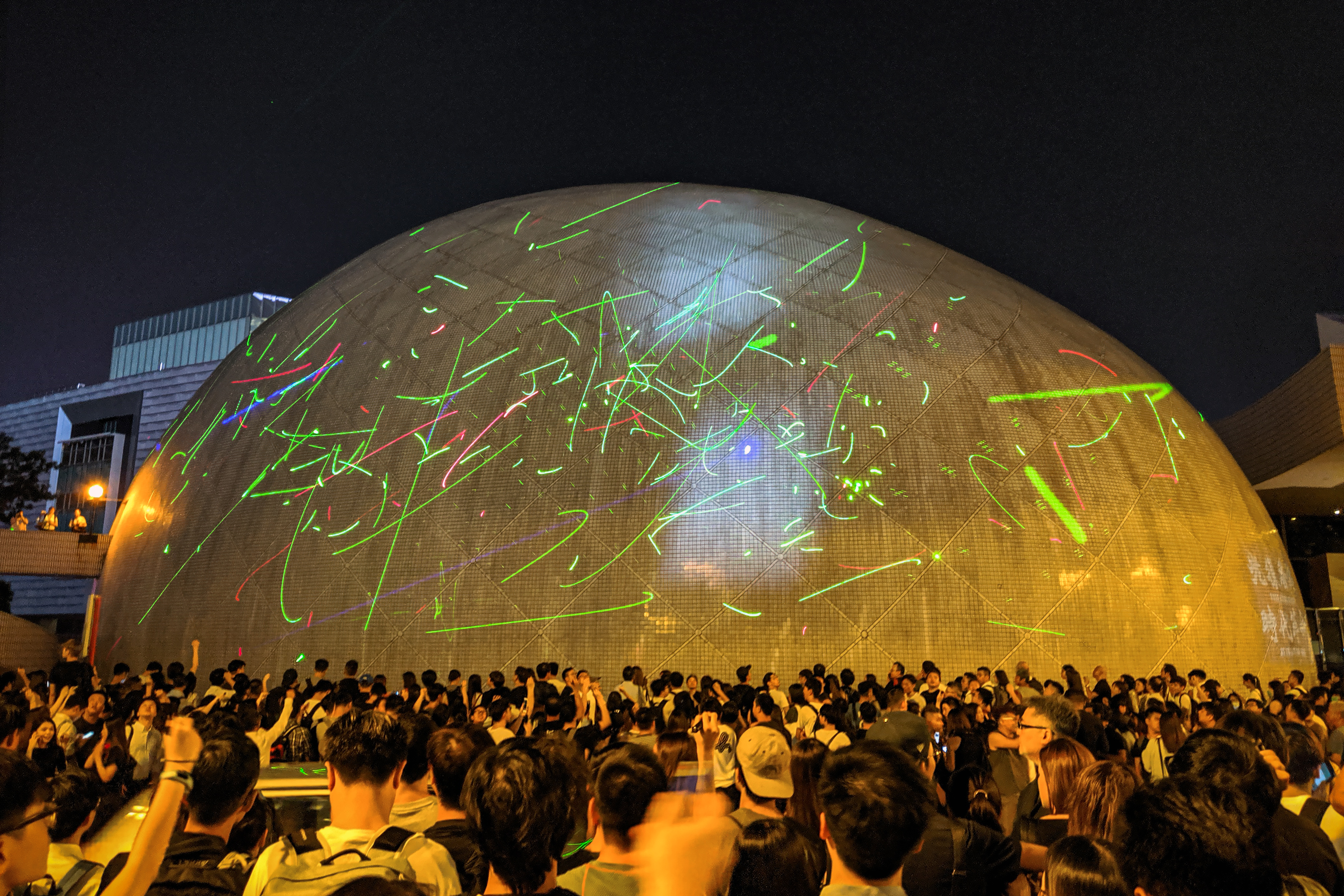
Protesters shining laser lights on the exteriors of the Hong Kong Space Museum, August 2019

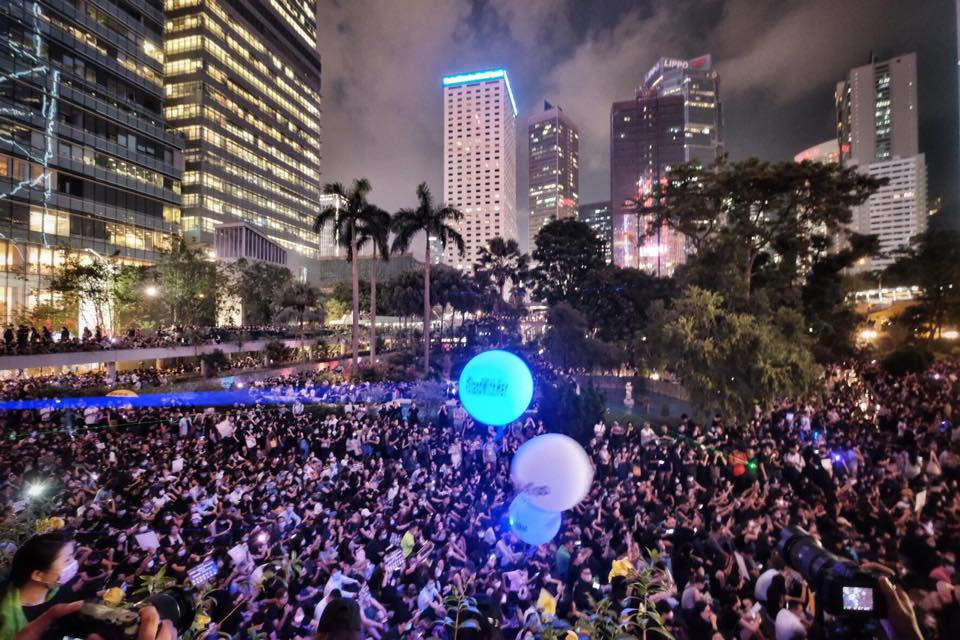
Thousands of protesters gathered in Chater Garden, August 2019

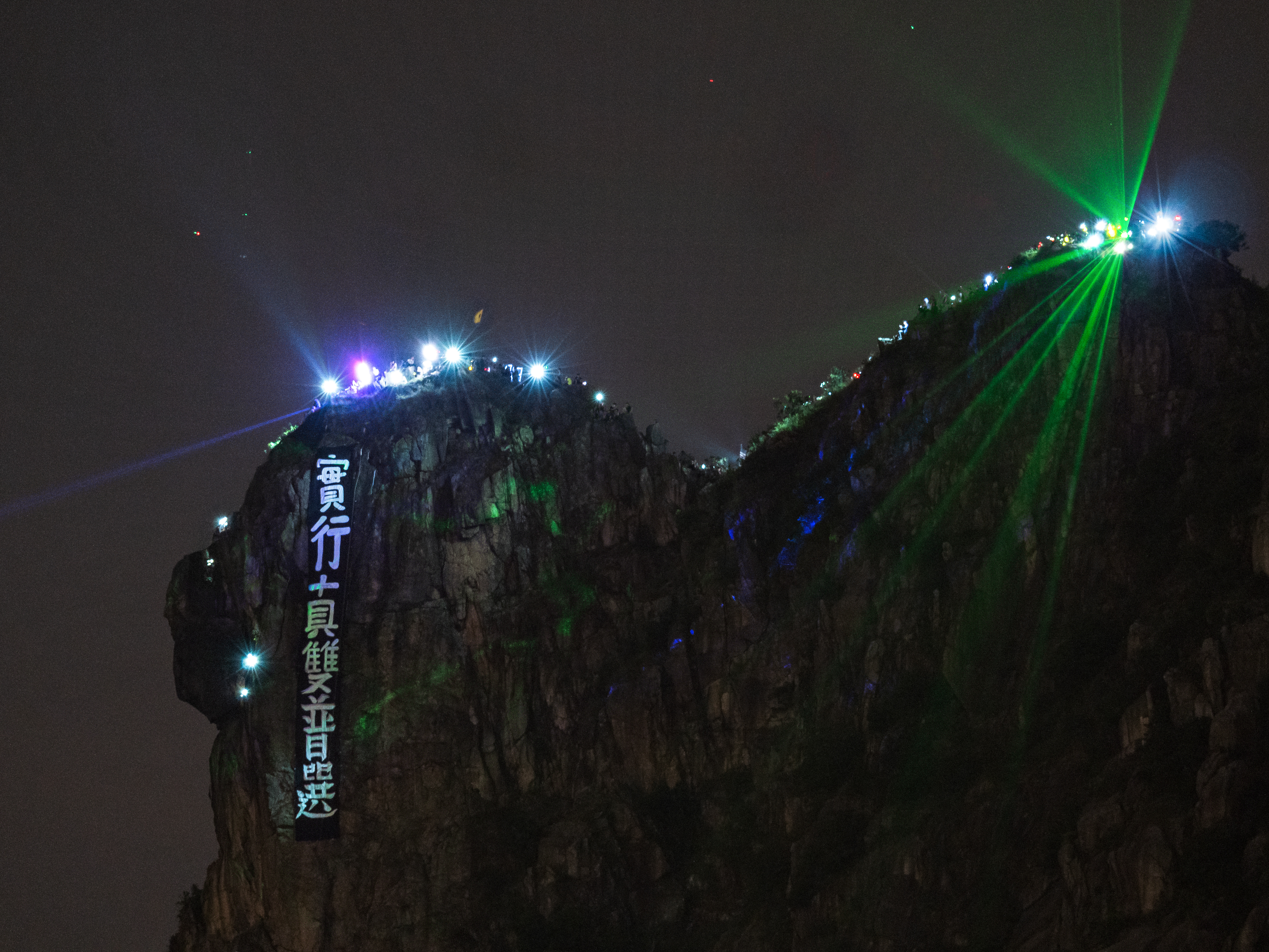
Protesters shining laser lights on Lion Rock during the Mid-Autumn Festival, September 2019

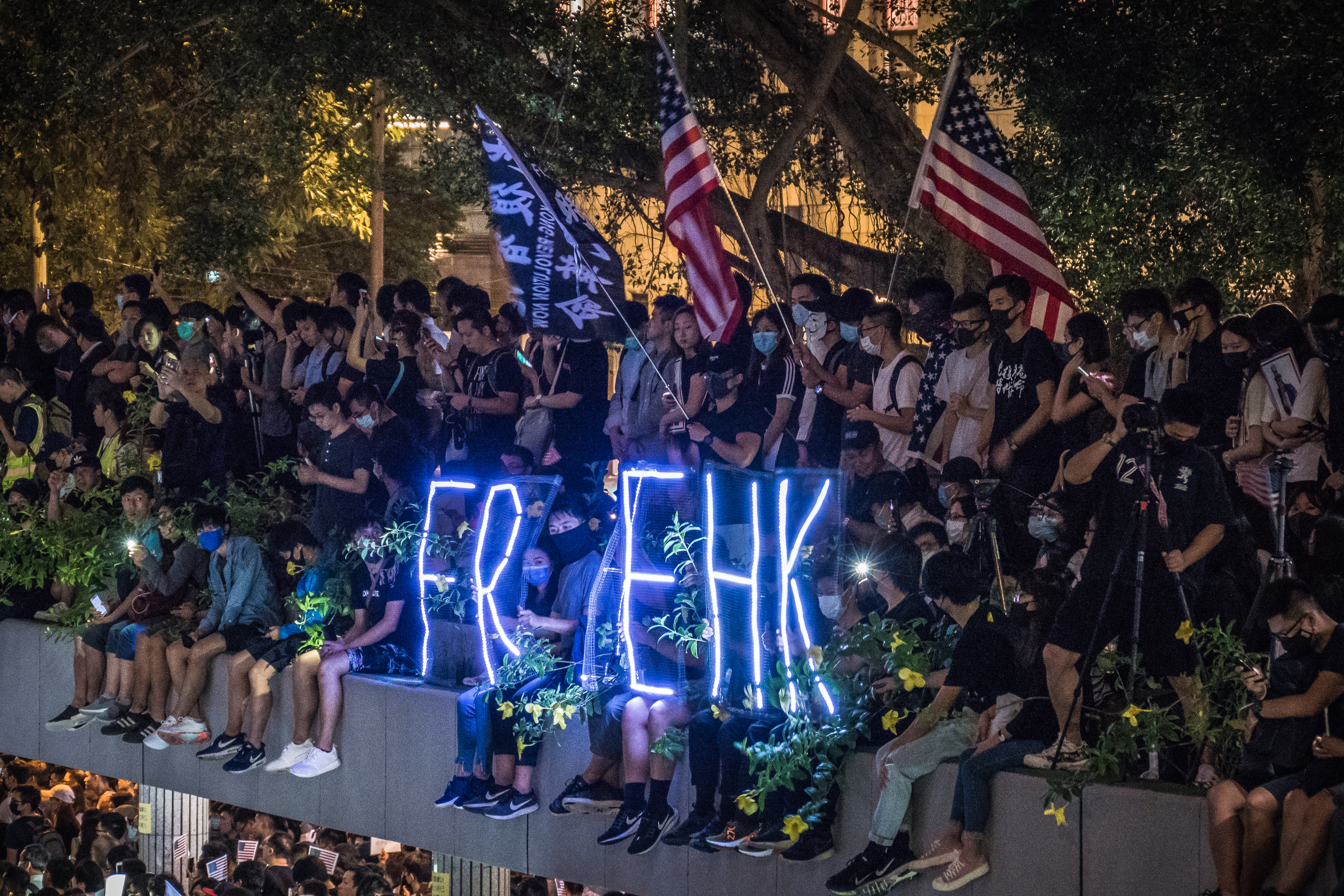
A light display with the words "Free HK," October 2019

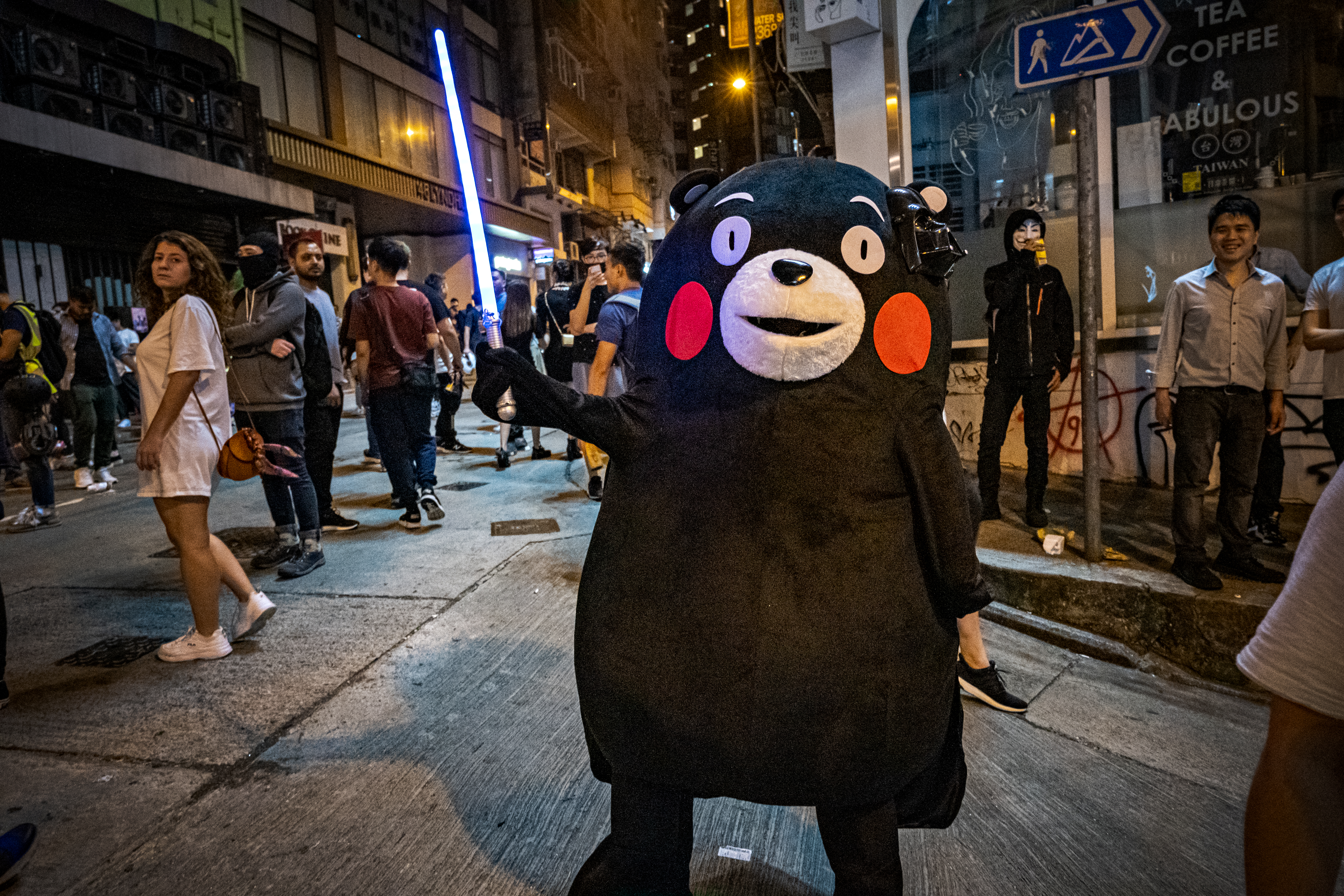
A protester, cosplaying as Kumamon swinging a toy lightsaber, Halloween 2019

=== Masks ===
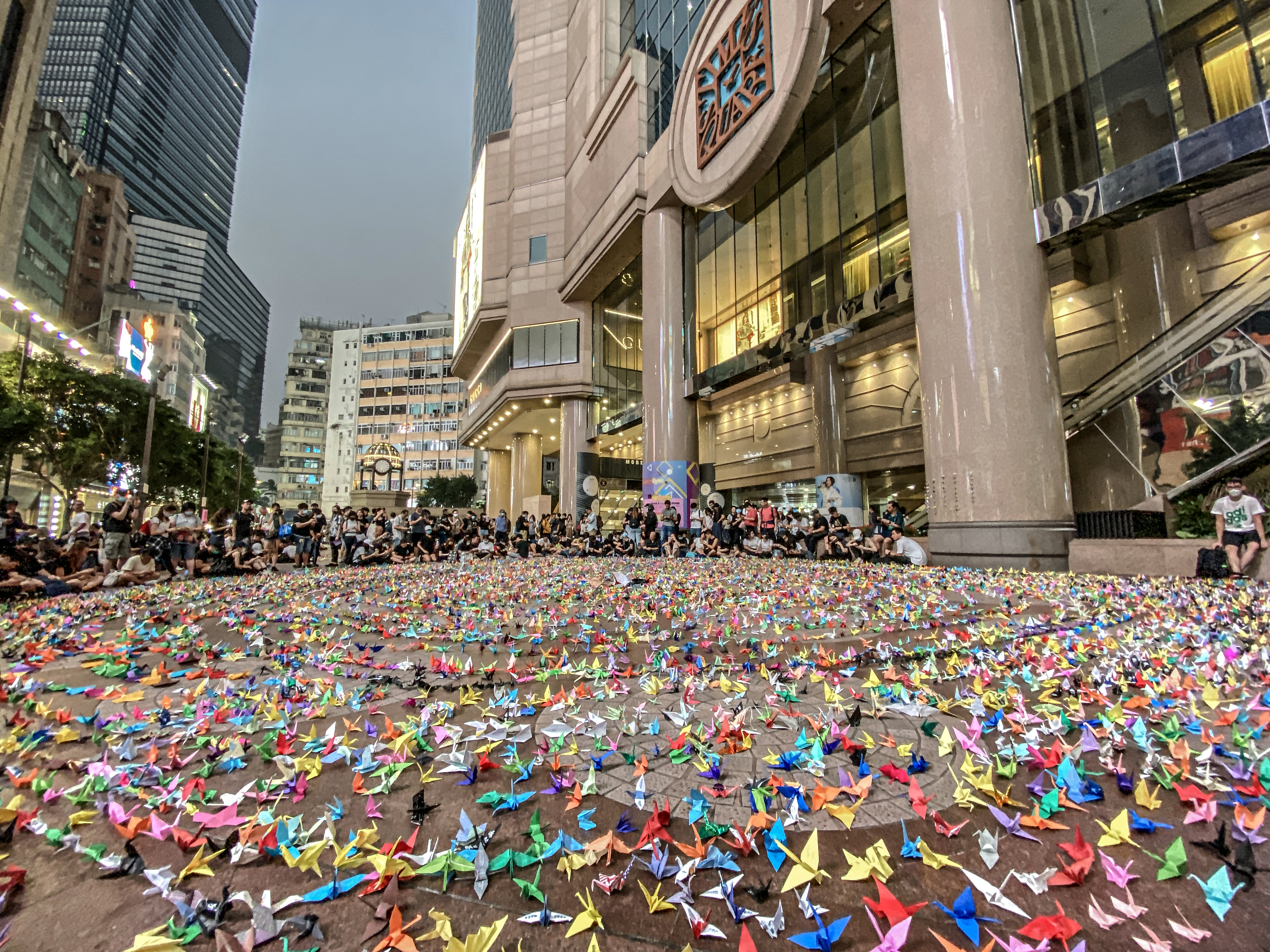
Folded "Freenix" during the anti-CCP protest, September 29, 2019

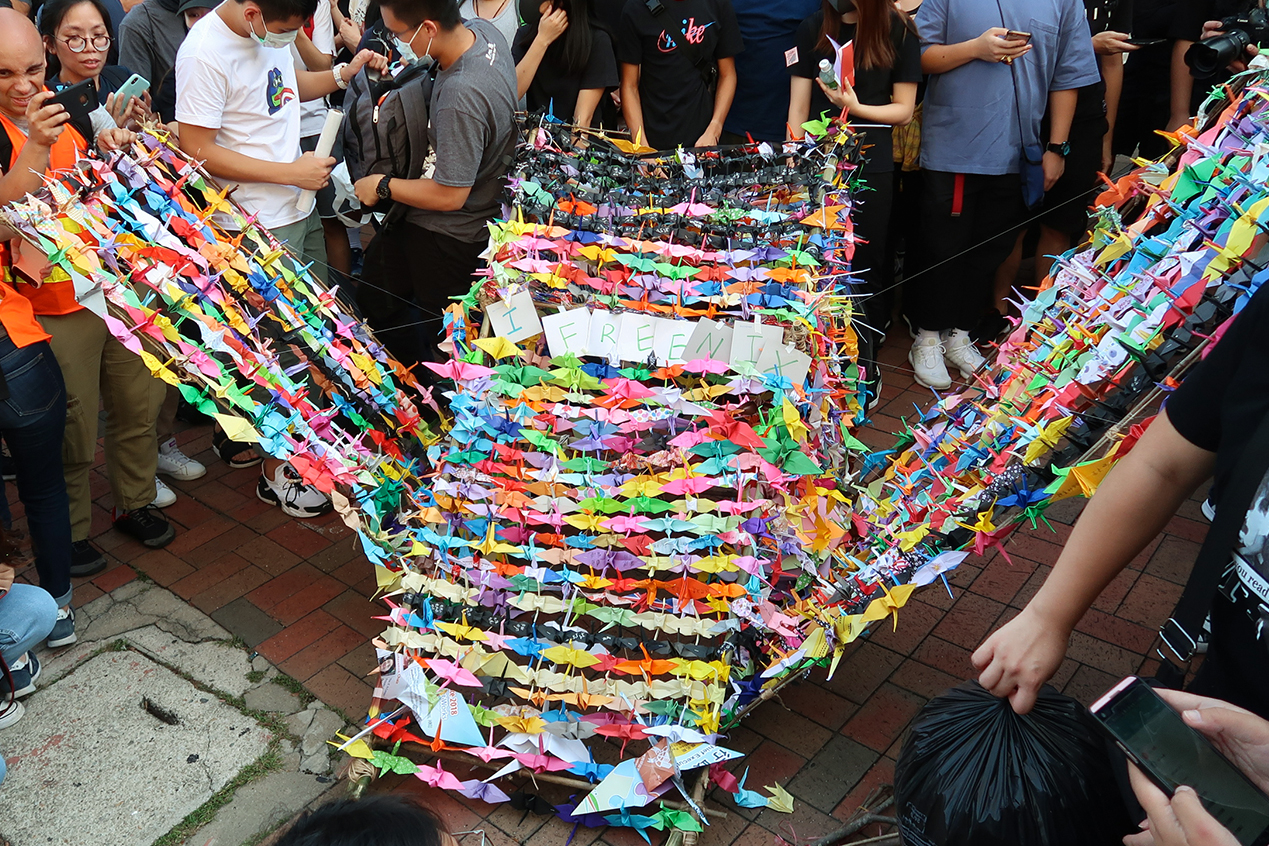
Freenix on a rack

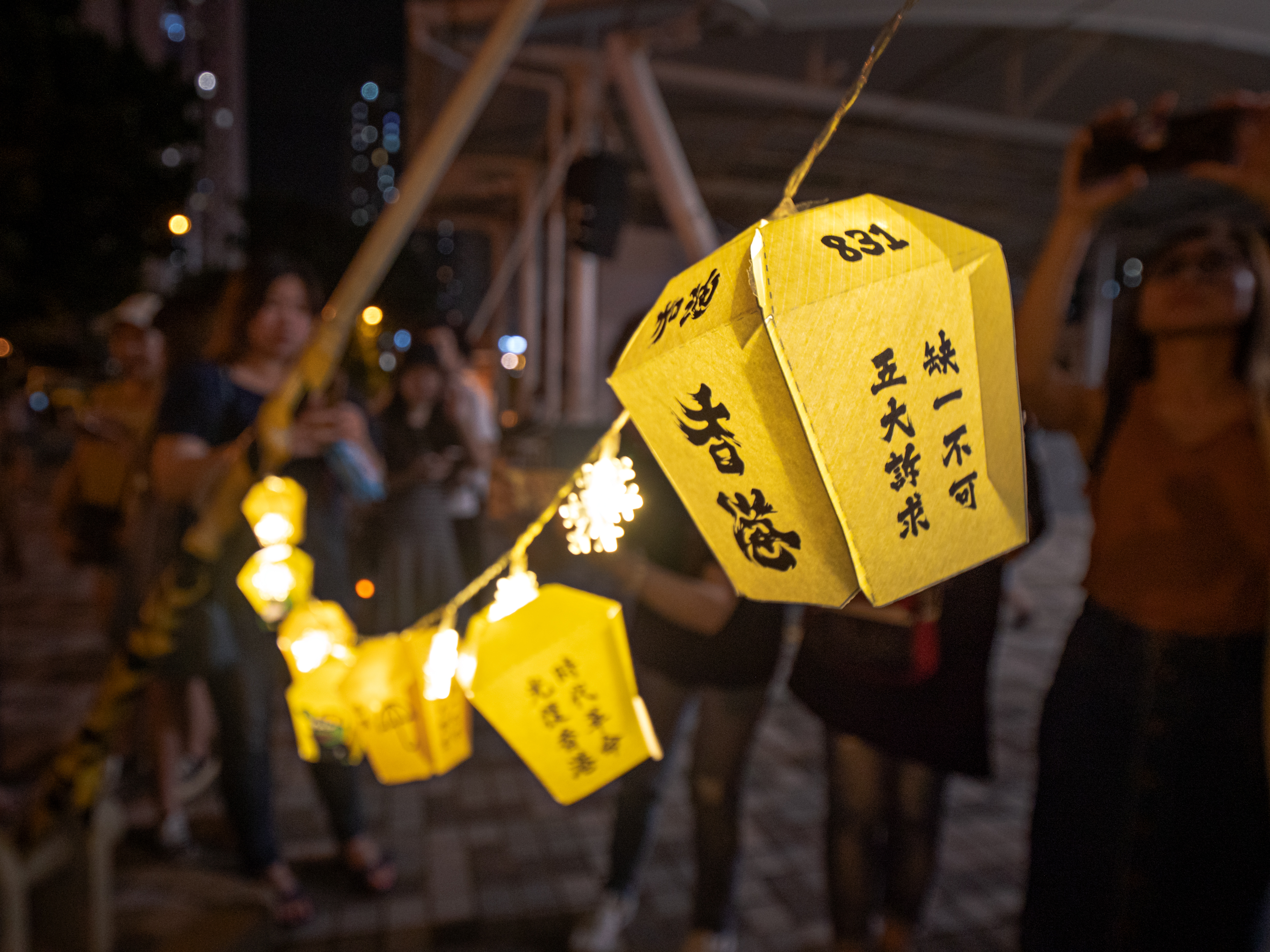
Lanterns with messages supporting the protesters, September 2019

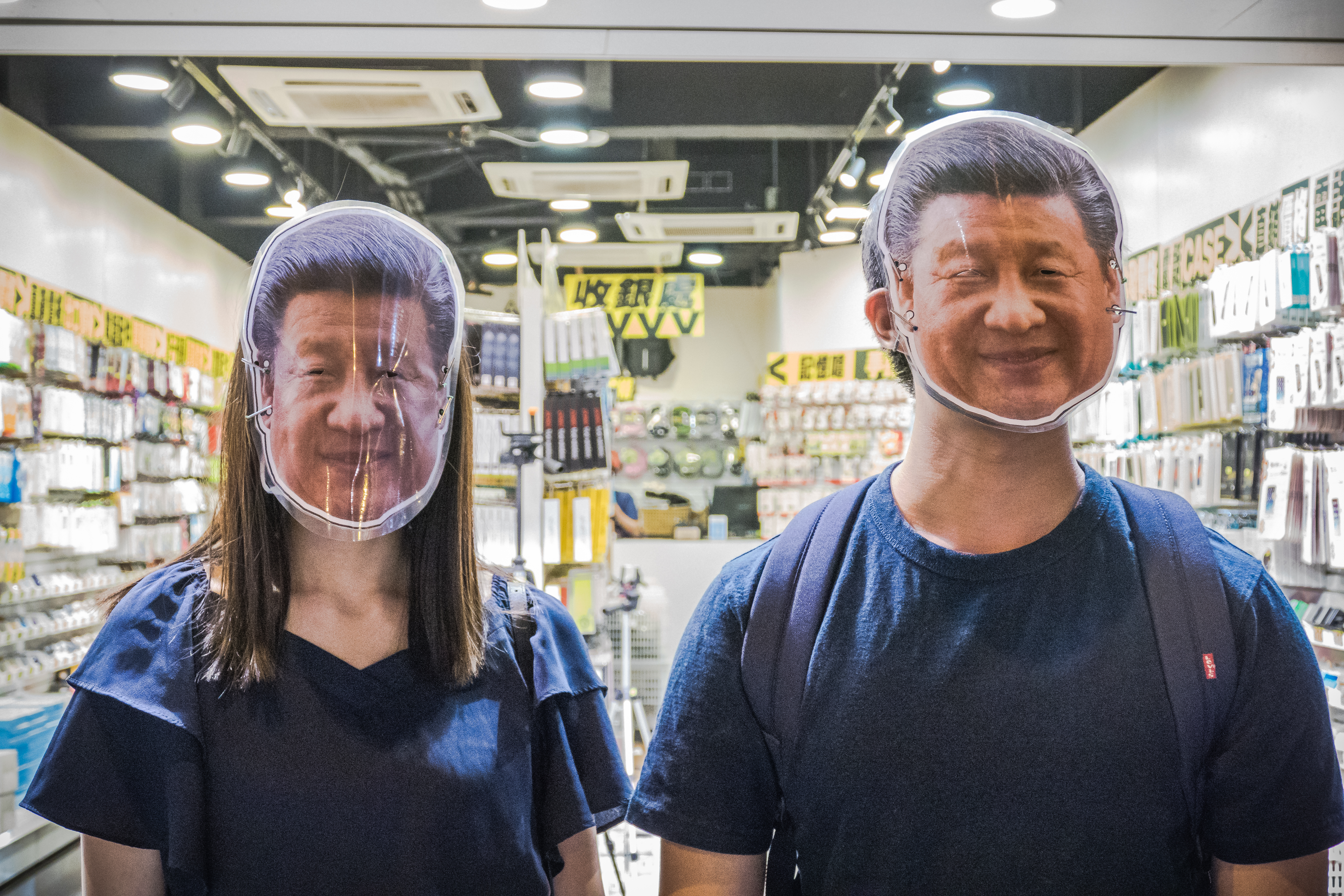
Protesters donning Xi Jinping masks, October 2019

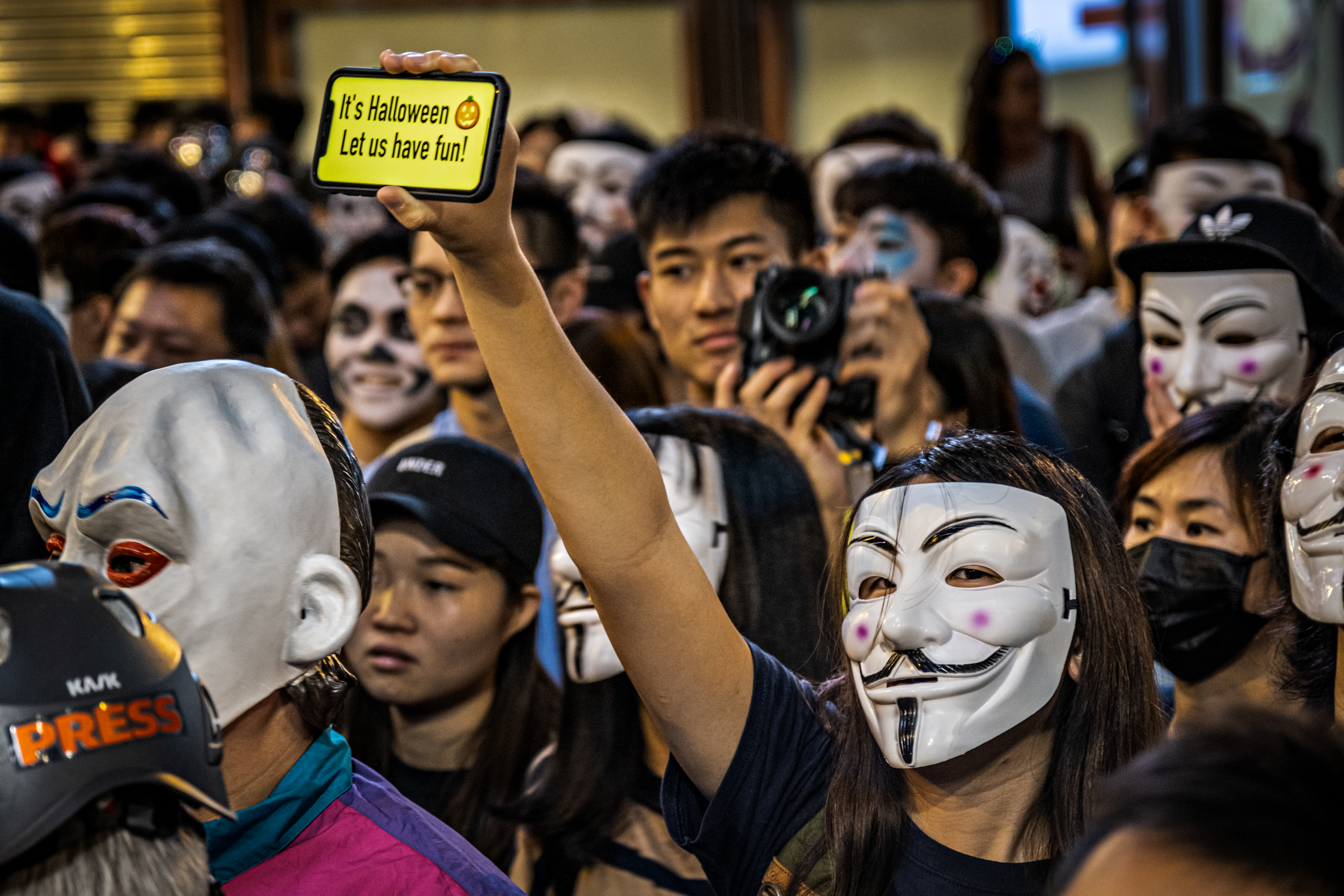
Protesters donning Guy Fawkes masks during Halloween 2019

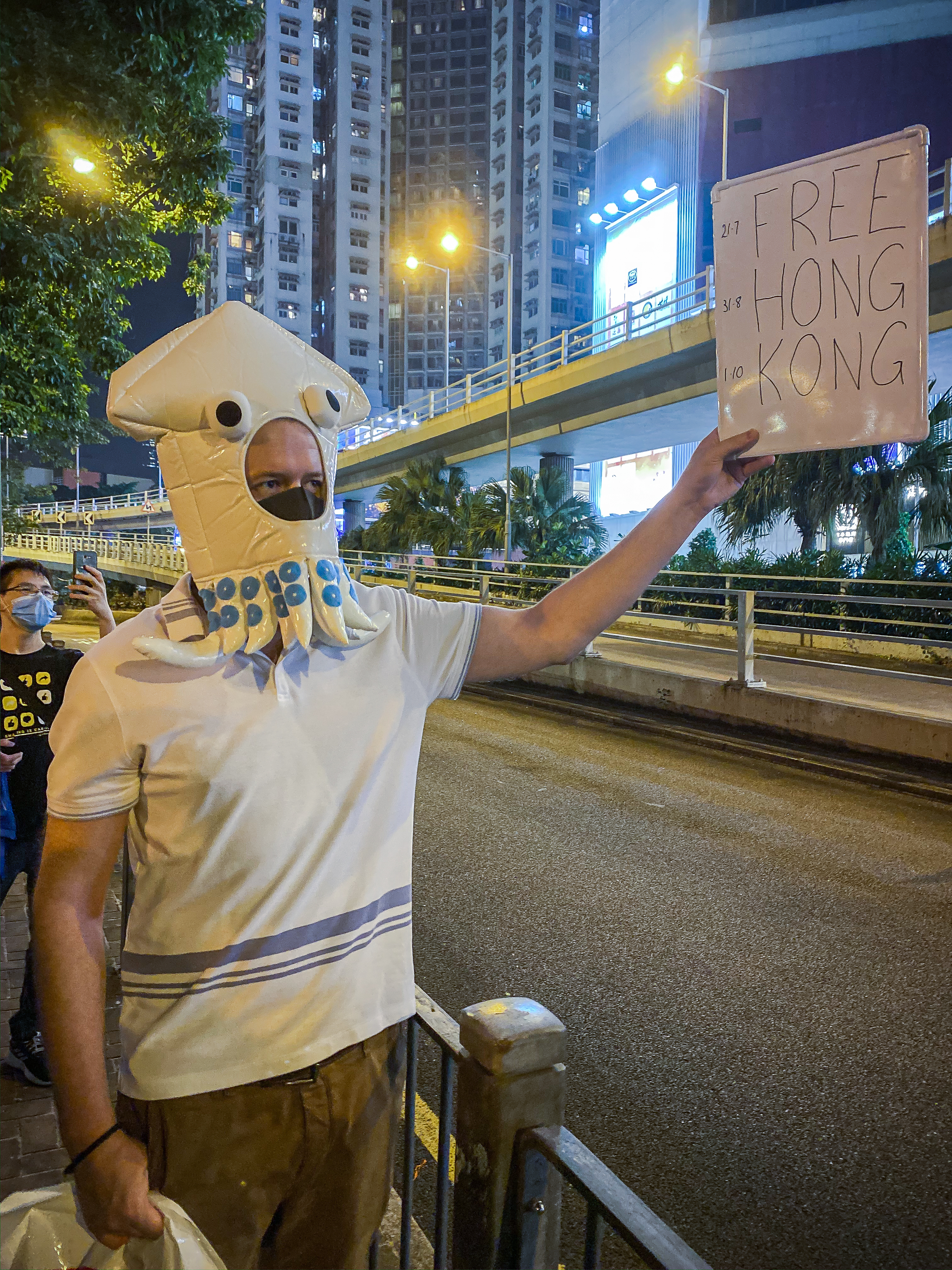
A protester with a squid mask, Halloween 2019

== See also ==
- Art of the 2014 Hong Kong protests
