= Sing Hallelujah to the Lord =

1974 Christian worship song

"Sing Hallelujah to the Lord" is a 1974 contemporary Christian worship song composed by Linda Stassen-Benjamin (born 1951) notable for its simplicity and popularity in many languages.

== Origin ==
The song was fully composed at a workshop at Calvary Chapel Costa Mesa, though the tune reportedly came to the songwriter while taking a shower, before she then took the tune to the composition group to work on harmonies. The song is in a minor key, which is unusual for a praise song.

It is unclear how many stanzas the song originally had, with some sources saying only one. In one popular form it is a four stanza song themed as an Easter hymn for Resurrection Sunday, and the four stanzas are derived from simple repeated statements from the Bible found in early Christian liturgies.

== Use in protests ==
"Sing Hallelujah to the Lord" has been used as a protest song during the 2019–20 Hong Kong protests. It is sung by many Christians and non-Christians in the protests. Under Hong Kong's Public Order Ordinance, religious gatherings are exempt from the definition of a "gathering" or "assembly" and therefore more difficult to police.

== Non-English-language versions ==
- French: "Chante alléluia au Seigneur"
- Spanish: "Canta aleluya al Señor"

== See also ==
- "We Shall Overcome", another hymn used as a protest song.
