= Hong Kong Way =

Human chain formed during 2019 protests

- Part of 2019–2020 Hong Kong protests
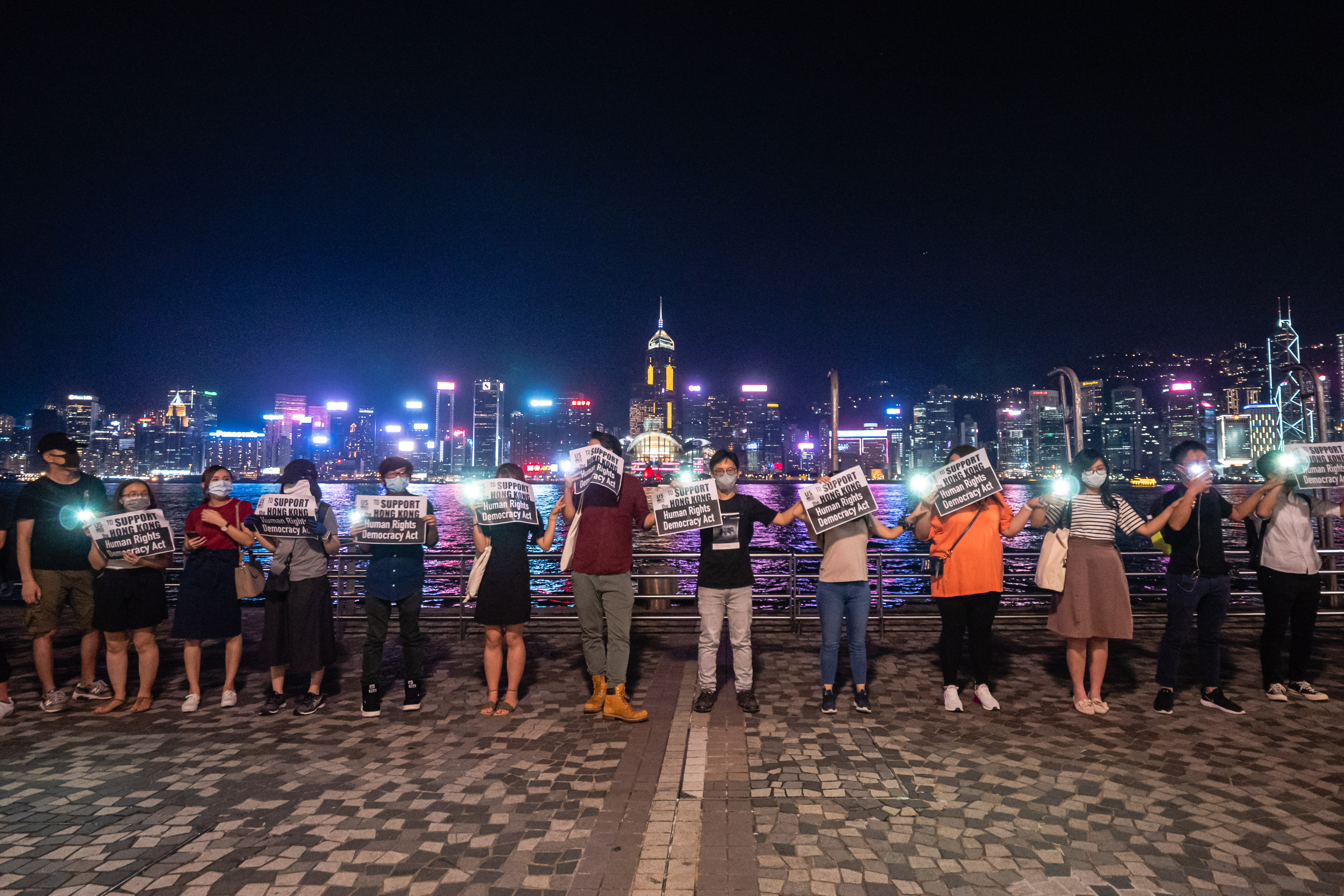
- Avenue of Stars
- Native name: 香港之路
- Date: 23 August 2019
- Location: Hong Kong (along Tsuen Wan line, Kwun Tong line, Island line; parts of Tseung Kwan O line, West Rail line; hiking trails on Lion Rock)
- Cause: Hong Kong Government's refusal to address the 5 key demands of the anti-extradition bill movement.
- Participants: Civil society

The Hong Kong Way was a peaceful political campaign held in Hong Kong on 23 August 2019, the 30th anniversary of the Baltic Way. The goal was to draw people's attention to the 2019 anti-extradition bill movement and the protesters' five demands for government accountability and democratic reform. Organisers estimated that 210,000 people participated. In the early night time hours, Hongkongers joined hands to create a human chain of 50 kilometres long on both sides of Victoria Harbour, along the three main MTR lines and over the top of Lion Rock, without any disruptions to traffic.

The action was inspired by the Baltic Way demonstration of 1989, which involved two million people, and contributed to the collapse of Soviet control of the region.

== Inspiration ==
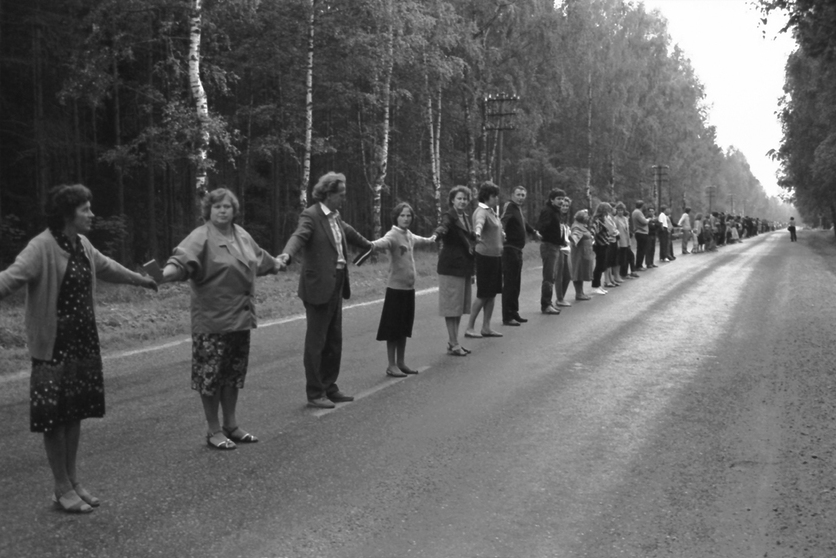
The Baltic Way in Latvia

The action was inspired by a similar event that occurred 30 years before, on 23 August 1989. The Baltic Way involved two million people in a human chain across 675 kilometres that linked the capitals of Estonia, Latvia, and Lithuania, serving as a call for restoration of independence from the Soviet Union. On 11 March 1990, within seven months of the Baltic Way, Lithuania became the first Soviet state to declare independence.

The Hong Kong Way idea was posted to the LIHKG forum on 19 August 2019 with the objectives of calling attention to police violence, attracting "the focus of international media, to show ... our determination and unity to fight for democracy" and "in the hopes of more international support." The event was also a peaceful show of unity and solidarity among Hong Kong people, a visual display of community strength in the face of challenges. Many participants wore masks, fearing that attending a peaceful rally could lead to reprisals by authorities or loss of employment as a result of pressures from Beijing. Despite the fears people still turned up. As protesters held hands to form the human chain, many chanted "add oil!" and "Democracy now!"

== Logistics and organisation ==
=== On the streets ===
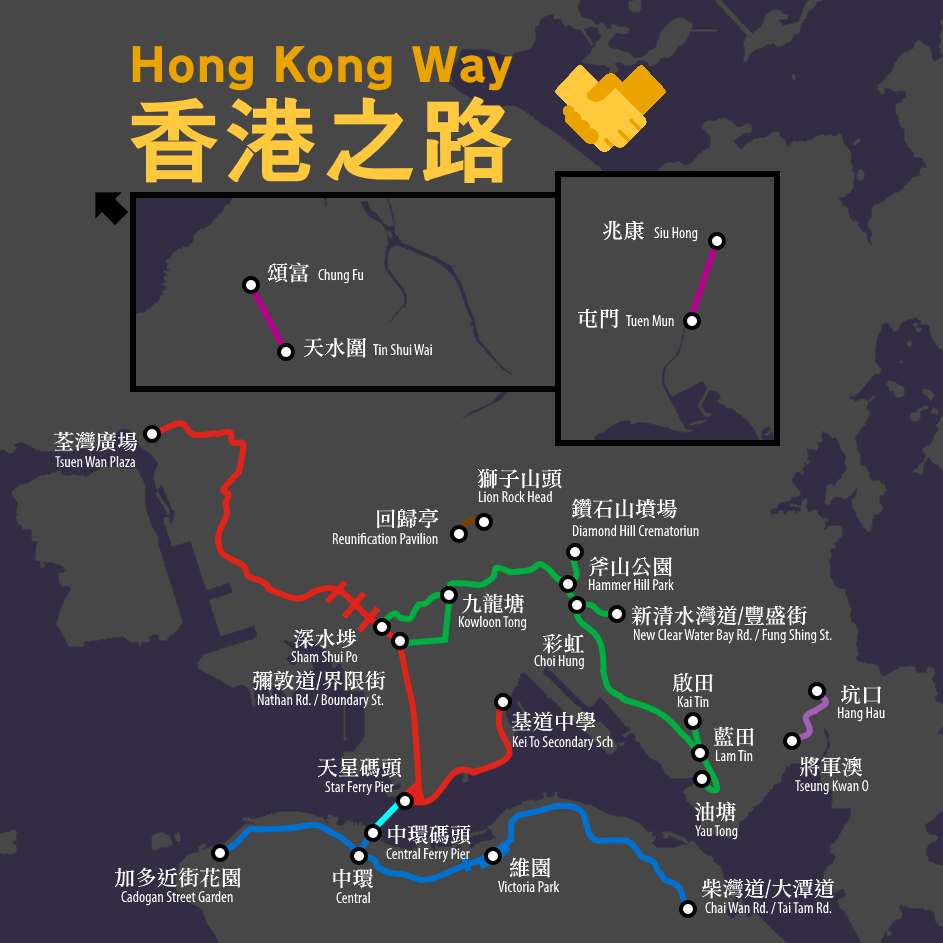
Map of Hong Kong Way

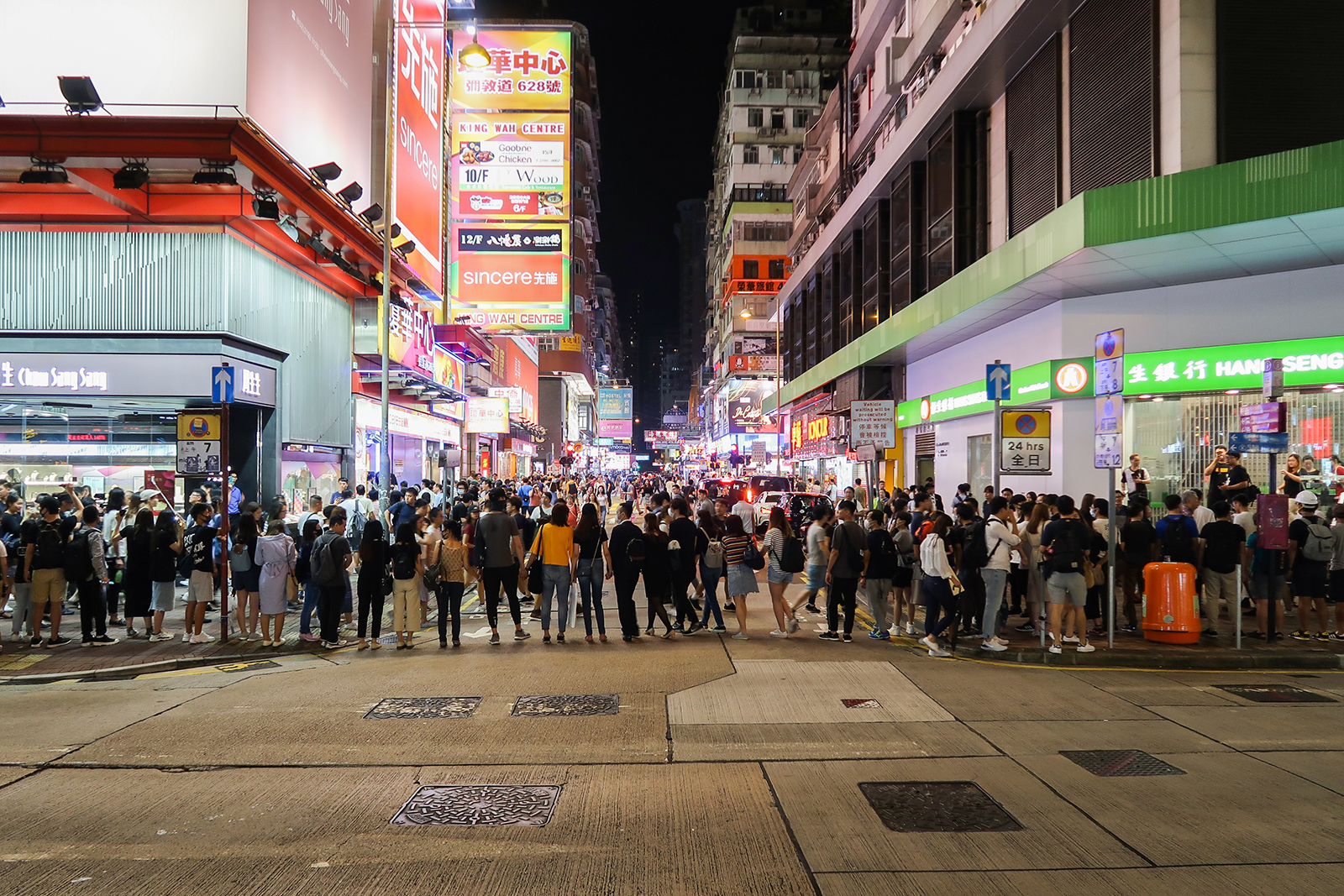
Nathan Road, Mong Kok, junction of Shantung Street

The Hong Kong Way event was organised from the LIHKG forum, along with real-time Telegram chat groups to assist with the creation of the human-chain. The event took place in the absence of a "letter of no objection" from the Hong Kong Police Force. Organisers created videos and posters, mapped out the route of the proposed human chain, and they used different Telegram channels for different sections around the city. Organisers billed the event for Friday, 23 August between 7 p.m. and 8 pm. They called on participants to assemble at 7 pm on pavements along the three main MTR lines in Hong Kong – the Tsuen Wan line, Kwun Tong line and Island line — and to hold hands, creating three human chains across Hong Kong Island, Kowloon, and the New Territories as a form of peaceful protest. Volunteers were on hand at every MTR station to direct demonstrators along the route to ensure the chain was continuous.

Participants stood in single file along pavements. At road junctions, the chain constantly reformed obeying traffic lights, so that vehicular traffic could flow normally. At 9 pm, demonstrators collectively covered up their right eye with one hand, to symbolise the first-aid worker who had lost an eye due to having been hit by a police bean bag round earlier in August. People were in positive mood, and the demonstration was entirely peaceful, with police keeping a low profile. Participants promptly departed from their positions shortly thereafter.

The campaign avoided North Point, which is known to be where many local Fujianese people reside. Democracy activists were previously assaulted by stick-wielding Fujianese residents who had attacked citizens during the previous phase of protests on 5 August.

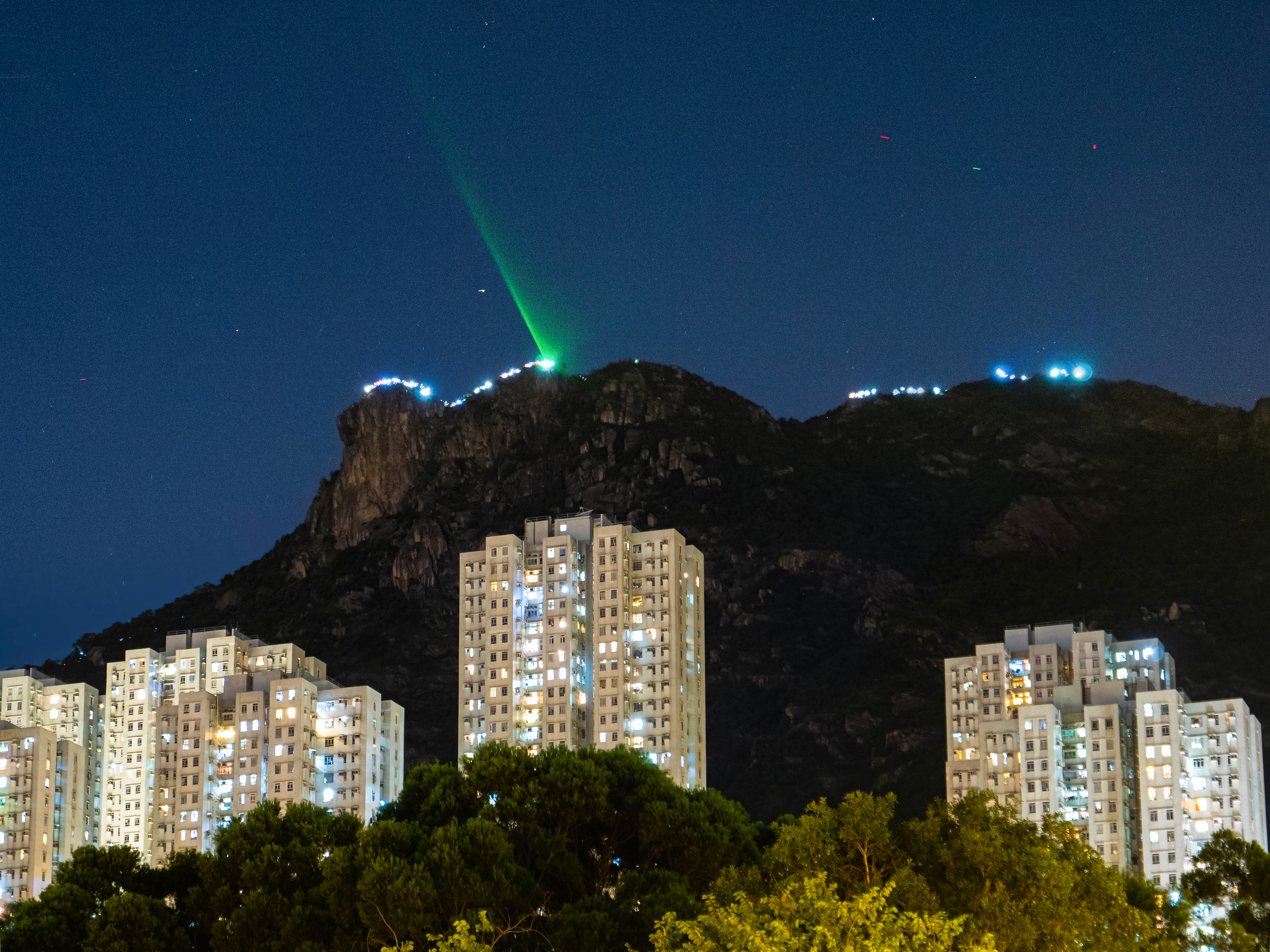
More than 1,000 hikers gathered on top of Lion Rock

=== Lion Rock ===
A team of hikers also scaled Lion Rock, a landmark that symbolises to many the spirit of Hong Kong, lighting their trail with torches. The group, initiated on Tuesday, organised separately from the MTR campaign so as not to detract from it. Organisers hoped to send a distinct and separate message of solidarity with the "Hong Kong Way". It attracted trail runners, hikers, and nature lovers. After getting to the top, they lit up the hilltop so that its outline was visible in many parts of Hong Kong; they sang "Glorious Years" by Beyond – written about Nelson Mandela's struggle against Apartheid in South Africa, and "Below the Lion Rock" – the theme song to an iconic television series of the same name. The group also organised a team to check the area the next day and clean up if necessary.

== Responses ==
Some 100 supporters joined hands in Lithuania on the same day to show their solidarity with Hong Kong's protests. Lithuanian lawmaker Mantas Adomėnas, who co-organised the rally with Emanuelis Zingeris, said he was 16 years old when he joined the Baltic Way. He said he was impressed with Hong Kong's struggle for liberty and democracy, having visited the city during the protests in 2014 and also during the 30th anniversary of the 1989 Tiananmen Square protests.

The Chinese central government in Beijing which had been claiming that the wave of protests over the previous 11 weeks was instigated by "foreign forces", had up to that point stopped short of calling the protests a colour revolution, but mainland scholars agreed that the symbolic reference to the collapse of the Soviet Union was "provocative" and would add to the government's concerns.

== See also ==
- 228 Hand-in-Hand rally, Taiwan (2004)
- Umbrella Movement
- Baltic Way (1989)
- Hands Across America (1986)
- Catalan Way (2013)
