= Anthem of Hong Kong =

Throughout the history of Hong Kong, the national anthem of the ruling sovereign state has always been adopted for use in an official capacity and played on occasions such as major sporting events or ceremonies.

As "March of the Volunteers" is the national anthem of the People's Republic of China, the song has been adopted by the Government of the Hong Kong Special Administrative Region for anthem performance since the handover of Hong Kong to the nation in 1997.

== History of official anthem adaptions ==
=== Under British governance ===
God Save the Queen / God Save the King
Representative anthem of British Hong Kong (1841–1941, 1945–1997)

"God Save the King" (alternatively "God Save the Queen" when the British monarch was female), the anthem of the British Empire, was used in an official capacity as to represent British Hong Kong internationally from 1841 to 1941 and from 1945 to 1997.

=== Under Japanese governance ===
"Kimigayo", the national anthem of the Empire of Japan, was used during the Japanese military occupation of Hong Kong from 1941 to 1945.

=== Under Chinese governance ===
March of the Volunteers
Representative anthem of the Hong Kong Special Administrative Region (1997–current)

"March of the Volunteers" has been adopted for official use and played at major sporting events and ceremonies of the Hong Kong Special Administrative Region internationally since the handover of Hong Kong in 1997.

The national anthem of the People's Republic of China is protected by statute in Hong Kong under the National Anthem Ordinance, and has since begun broadcasting regularly on radio and television stations including TVB, RTHK, ViuTV, and HOY TV before the main news or morning news programmes as mandated by the Hong Kong government since the introduction of the Ordinance in 2020.

== Unofficial anthems ==
Because these anthems are representative of the sovereign states and not the city itself, over the course of history there have been numerous other songs being circulated as the city's anthem, typically seen as symbolizing the spirit of Hong Kong.

- "Below the Lion Rock", a Cantopop song by Roman Tam, adopted as an informal anthem during the 2003 SARS outbreak.
- "Boundless Oceans, Vast Skies", a song by rock band Beyond, adopted as an informal anthem during the 2014 Hong Kong protests.
- "Glory to Hong Kong", a protest song by "Thomas dgx yhl" and netizens on LIHKG that was widely popular during the 2019–2020 Hong Kong protests, with some Hongkongers and supporters of democracy in Hong Kong considering the song an anthem that reflects the identity of Hong Kong. For a long time it was the top result on Google Search for "national anthem of Hong Kong," which supposedly contributed to its accidental and controversial playing as the anthem of Hong Kong at several international sports events.

== See also ==
- Flag of Hong Kong
- Emblem of Hong Kong
