= Beneath the Lion Rock =

Beneath the Lion Rock (Chinese: 獅子山下) is an alternative English translation for:

- Below the Lion Rock, a TV show about the lives of Hong Kong citizens
- Below the Lion Rock (song), the theme song of the show, sung by Roman Tam
