= Glory to Hong Kong =

Song of the 2019–2020 Hong Kong protests

Song
- Language: Cantonese; English
- Written: June–August 2019
- Published: 31 August 2019
- Recorded: 28–29 August 2019
- Genre: Protest song; Hymn
- Length: 1:45
- Composer: Thomas dgx yhl
- Lyricists: Thomas dgx yhl; Netizens on LIHKG

External videos
- "Glory to Hong Kong" on YouTube
- "Glory to Hong Kong" official English version on YouTube
- "Glory to Hong Kong" orchestra and chorus edition on YouTube
- "Glory to Hong Kong" Luminous version on YouTube

Glory to Hong Kong
- Traditional Chinese: 願榮光歸香港
- Literal meaning: May Glory Return to Hong Kong
Transcriptions
Standard Mandarin
- Hanyu Pinyin: Yuàn Róngguāng Guī Xiānggǎng
- Bopomofo: ㄩㄢˋ ㄖㄨㄥˊ ㄍㄨㄤ ㄍㄨㄟ ㄒㄧㄤ ㄍㄤˇ
- Wade–Giles: Yüan^{4} Jung^{2}-kuang^{1} Kuei^{1} Hsiang^{1}-kang^{3}
- Tongyong Pinyin: Yuàn Róng-guang Guei Sianggǎng
- IPA: [ɥɛ̂n.ɻʊ̌ŋ kwáŋ.kwéɪ ɕjáŋ.kàŋ]
Yue: Cantonese
- Yale Romanization: Yuhn Wìhnggwōng Gwāi Hēunggóng
- Jyutping: jyun6 wing4 gwong1 gwai1 hoeng1 gong2
- IPA: [jy:n˨ wɪŋ˨˩ kwɔ:ŋ˥ kwɐi˥ hœ:ŋ˥ kɔ:ŋ˧]

"Glory to Hong Kong" (Chinese: 願榮光歸香港; Jyutping: jyun6 wing4 gwong1 gwai1 hoeng1 gong2; Cantonese Yale: Yuhn Wìhnggwōng Gwāi Hēunggóng) is a protest anthem that was composed and written by a musician under the pseudonym "Thomas dgx yhl", with the contribution of a group of Hongkonger netizens from the online forum LIHKG during the 2019–2020 Hong Kong protests. It was initially written in Cantonese and was eventually developed into various language versions starting with English.

Since widespread protests to the extradition bill in Hong Kong erupted in early June 2019, songs such as "Do You Hear the People Sing?" from Les Misérables have been sung by protesters as their anthems. "Glory to Hong Kong", according to the composer, was created "to boost protesters' morale and unite people". Since the song's publication, it has been sung at most demonstrations. There are also numerous versions in English and other languages.

Using the search term "the national anthem of Hong Kong" on Google had frequently returned "Glory to Hong Kong" as the top search result, leading to the song being used in several international competitions. In response, Hong Kong authorities have accused the song of promoting subversion and banned it under the national security law, which defines acts of secession, subversion, terrorism, and collusion with foreign forces, and is punishable with life imprisonment.

== Background ==
Thomas, a music composer and Cantonese-language lyricist, first posted an instrumental version of "Glory to Hong Kong" and its lyrics on 26 August 2019 to LIHKG, an online forum where pro-democracy Hongkongers exchange views. After receiving suggestions from the forum users, he modified the lyrics, including the incorporation of the phrase "Liberate Hong Kong; revolution of our times" (Chinese: 光復香港，時代革命; Jyutping: gwong1fuk6 hoeng1gong2, si4doi6 gaak3ming6; Cantonese Yale: Gwōngfuhk hēunggóng, sìhdoih gaakmihng), a motto at the protests. The song's music video, comprising scenes from demonstrations, was uploaded to YouTube on 31 August 2019. The song went viral within a few days across various social media, followed by the emergence of versions in English and other languages. An orchestral music video with SATB chorus was uploaded to YouTube on 11 September 2019, reaching 1.5 million views within a week. Hong Kong protesters previously sung "Do You Hear the People Sing?" and "Sing Hallelujah to the Lord" as protest anthems, before adopting "Glory to Hong Kong" as their main anthem.

In an interview with Time magazine, the author-composer said: "Music is a tool for unity, I really felt like we needed a song to unite us and boost our morale. The message to listeners is that despite the unhappiness and uncertainty of our time, Hong Kong people will not surrender." In an interview with Stand News, the composer explained his motivation to compose a new protest song for Hong Kong in place of songs commonly sung during protests such as "Boundless Oceans, Vast Skies" and "Glory Days", two songs by Hong Kong band Beyond, describing the songs as "not unpleasant to listen to", but that their rhythm was somewhat out of place with the atmosphere during protests. The composer said he was predominantly a pop rock artist, noting that a classical-style production like "Glory to Hong Kong" was a personal first. Inspired by "God Save the King", "The Star-Spangled Banner", the national anthem of Russia, the "Battle Hymn of the Republic" and "Gloria in Excelsis Deo" by Antonio Vivaldi, he spent two months composing the song's melody working backwards from the line "我願榮光歸香港" ("I wish that glory return to Hong Kong").

The song was observed to have similar connotations to Roman Tam's "Below the Lion Rock", a Cantopop song highly regarded among Hong Kongers in association with the sense of the region's common spirit.

== Origin of the title ==
Orchestra in black bloc playing the march Glory to Hong Kong

The word "glory" (榮光) in the song title consists of the Chinese characters for honour (榮; wing4) and brilliance (光; gwong1). The term has been used in poems by Li Bai and a prose by Lu Xun, in addition to being a common term used by Christians. The composer noted that he was irreligious, and described the last sentence "Glory be to Hong Kong" (Chinese: 我願榮光歸香港; lit. 'I wish that glory return to Hong Kong') as his twofold wish: that Hong Kong can regain its glory in the future, and that Hongkongers are willing to dedicate their pride and triumphs to the city.

== Lyrics ==
"Glory to Hong Kong" comprises four stanzas of lyrics in Cantonese. The author states that he prioritised the meaning of the lyrics over the rhyming of lines, and explains the meaning of each stanza as follows:

The first stanza solemnly describes the suppression and deprivation of fundamental human rights, such as democracy, liberty and justice.

The second stanza describes the anti-Extradition Law Amendment Bill movement, where the people stand up to injustice even though blood is shed. The solemness follows that in the first stanza.

The third stanza describes the perseverance of Hong Kong people in darkness and despair. It is performed with slightly less solemn character.

The final stanza, with the most recognisable motto "Liberate Hong Kong; revolution of our times" incorporated in the lyrics, envisages that the city will regain its glory and honour. It expresses hope for the future, ending the song with excitement.

=== Other languages ===
Various versions of English lyrics have appeared online. Shek Ga-mak, a Hong Kong expatriate in Germany, released German lyrics for the song on 11 September 2019. Japanese lyrics for the song were also released by an anonymous Japanese person on 18 September 2019. Members of Action Free Hong Kong Montreal performed a French version written by netizen assuming pseudonym "Montreal Guy", which was uploaded to YouTube on 26 September 2019. Pícnic per la República released and sung a Catalan version on 24 October 2019 in front of the Chinese Consulate of Barcelona. A Taiwanese version was premiered by the indie band The Chairman during a solidarity concert in Taipei on 17 November 2019. Stefano Lodola released an Italian version in 2019 on YouTube.

== Public use ==
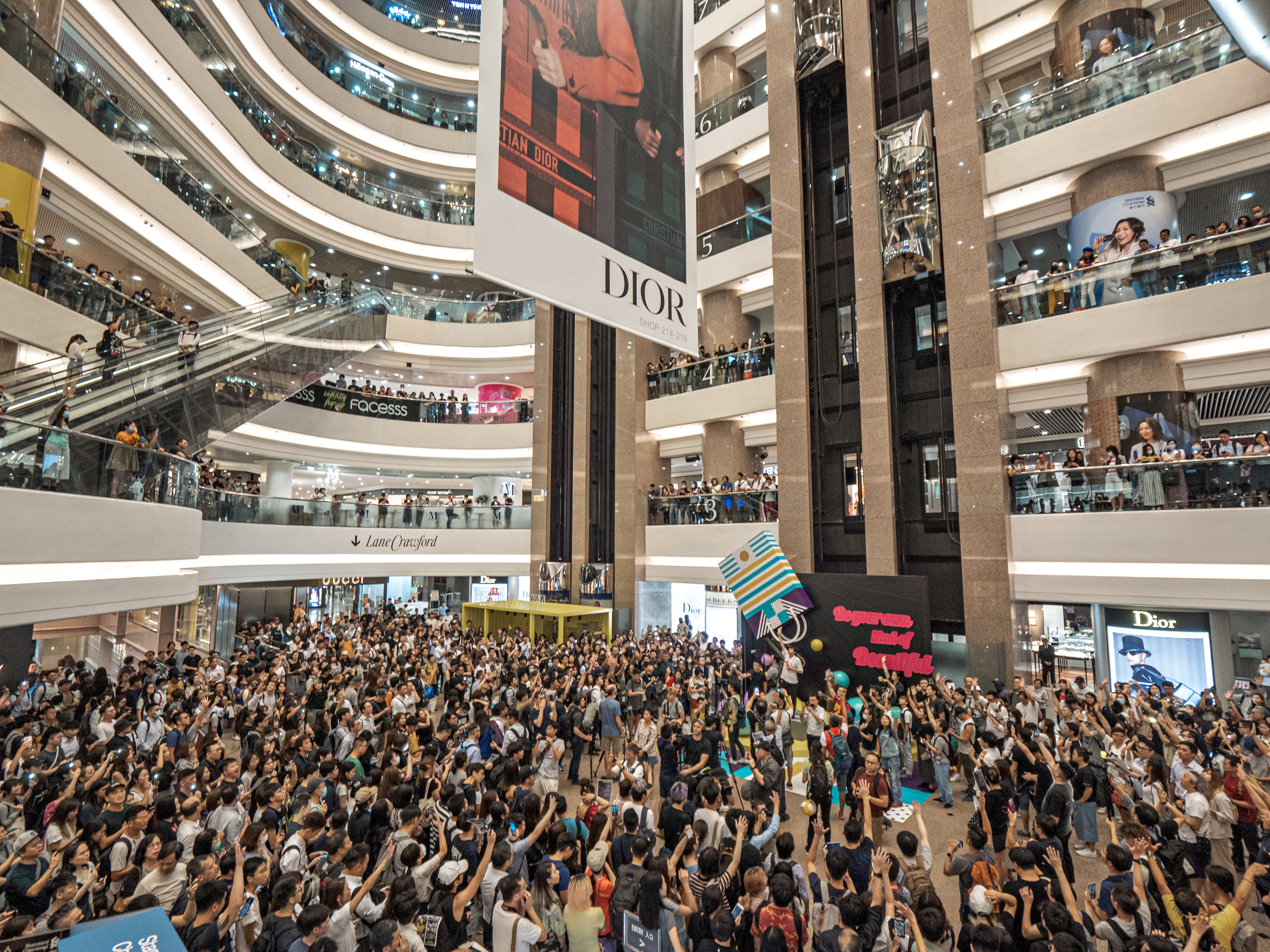
People singing the song at Times Square, Causeway Bay

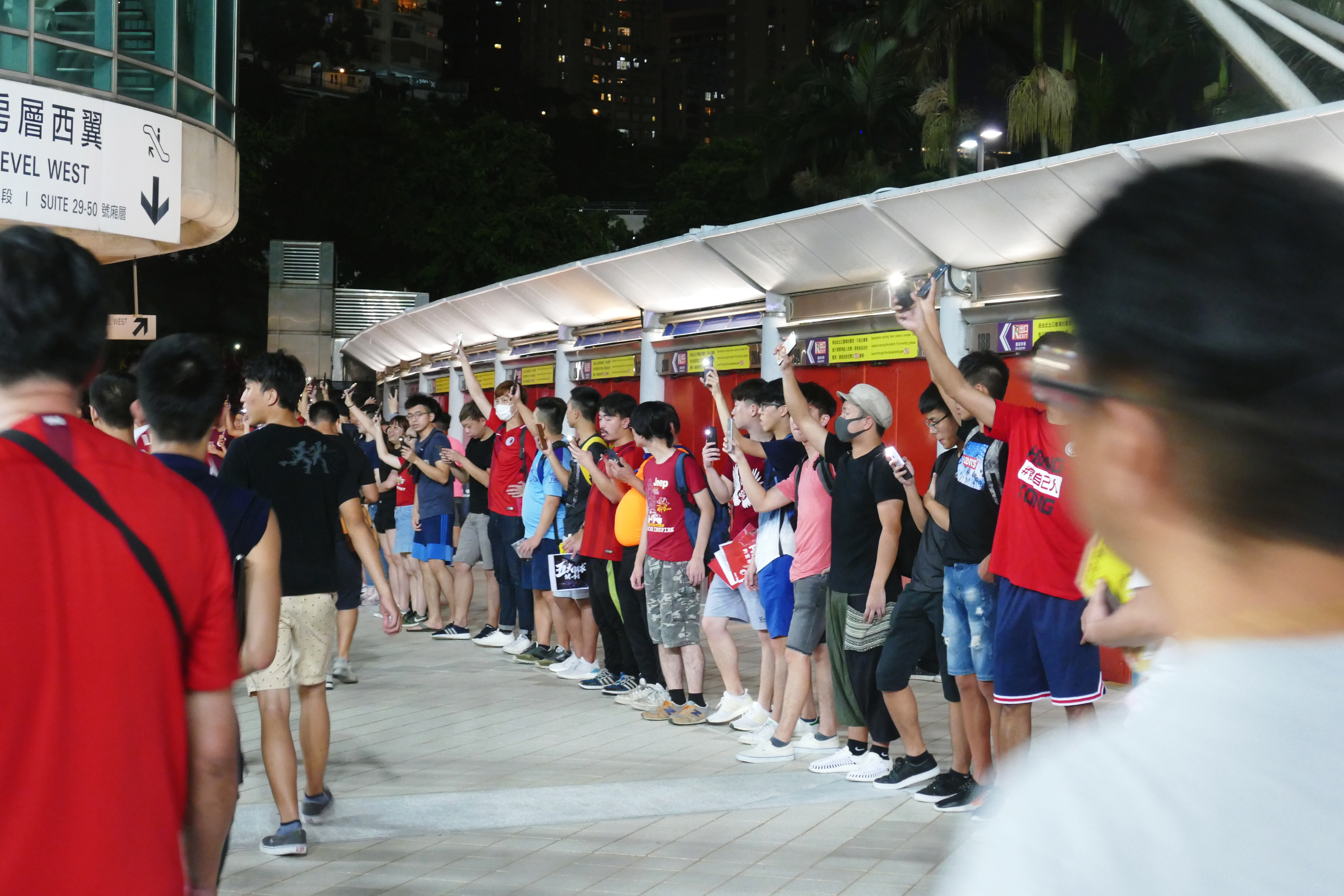
Football fans singing the song during Hong Kong's match against Iran on 10 September 2019

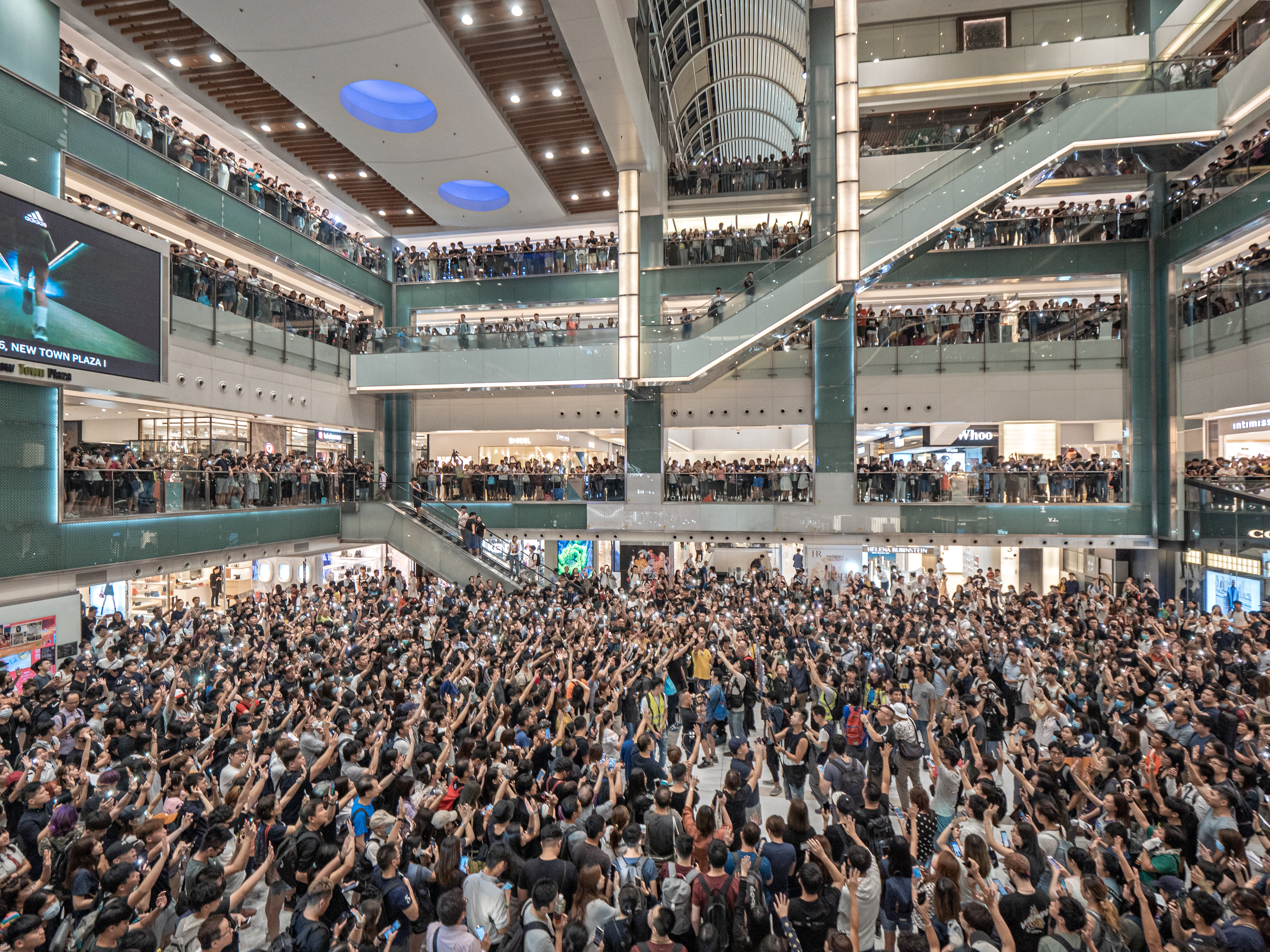
Around 1000 people singing the song "Glory to Hong Kong" in New Town Plaza

The song has been sung on numerous occasions by citizens in the public all over the city. 200 people participated in a sit-in at Prince Edward station on 6 September 2019, requesting MTR to hand over footage of the attacks on passengers conducted by police on 31 August; in addition to chanting slogans, the protesters sang this anthem and "Do You Hear the People Sing?". A few hundred people sang the song together at Cityplaza on 9 September. On 10 September, Hong Kong football supporters sang the song at a match for the first time during a FIFA World Cup qualification match against Iran, booing the Chinese anthem. On the same night, the song was again publicly sung by large groups at more than a dozen shopping malls across Hong Kong at 8:31 pm, a reference to both the police attacks on 31 August and the 2014 NPCSC Decision on Hong Kong which was declared on 31 August 2014. On 11 September, around 100 people sang the song together in a memorial meeting for a suicide victim held at Ka Shing Court in Fanling. Around 500 students from 10 secondary schools in Kwun Tong District, Tseung Kwan O and Kowloon City District organised a human chain, in which they sang the song. Around 1000 people sang the song in New Town Plaza together that night, with crowds of people singing the song in other shopping malls around Hong Kong as well.

== Reception ==
Robyn Dixon and Marcus Yam of Los Angeles Times described "Glory to Hong Kong" as having "a more indigenous, electric, unifying effect" when compared to songs that were previously used at the protests. The march's Cantonese lyrics, in particular, affirms a sense of a collective cultural identity which is at the heart of the conflict. The lyrics evokes a sense of pride and belonging to Hong Kongers who struggle for identity after the 1997 handover to China. The hymn-like composition was also seen as "supremely approachable" to the populace who were accustomed to the Christian music tradition introduced by the region's British and missionary-influenced educational system.

The Chinese edition of Deutsche Welle named "Glory to Hong Kong" the "anthem" of the Hong Kong protests. The Chinese edition of Voice of America described the lyrics of the song as reflecting the heartfelt views of protestors. Taiwanese newspaper Liberty Times described the song as "the military march of protesters" (抗爭者軍歌), singing their anxiety towards Hong Kong's political situation, as well as an "unrelenting revolutionary spirit". Describing the song, Chinese Television System News noted that the song had "peaceful vocals coupled with scenes of bloody conflicts between Hong Kong Police and the people" and that by creating "Glory to Hong Kong", Hongkongers recorded their "history of struggling for democracy and freedom". Chow Po-chung, a professor of politics and public administration at the Chinese University of Hong Kong noted that the song's melody and lyrics resonated with many people and united protesters, leading to many people developing great "attachment" to the song. Former President of the Legislative Council of Hong Kong Jasper Tsang praised the song as a high-quality technical production, believing it to be produced by professional musicians. He said that the song shows that the government's efforts at promotion have been weak.

Wen Wei Po, a state-owned newspaper controlled by the Hong Kong Liaison Office, published an article on its front page on 12 September, criticising the song as the anthem for Hong Kong independence, and that the lyrics idealise violence. The title of the article, "獨歌洗腦，煽走獨路" may be translated as "Independence song brainwashes, touting independence as the route [for Hong Kong]", though "independence" may be treated as a pun for "poison" in this context due to its Chinese pronunciation. Carmen Poon published an article in Ming Pao on 13 September entitled "The brainwashing song that trumpets Hong Kong independence" (鼓吹港獨的洗腦歌), in which she describes the "elegant lyrics" of the song as "advocating hate", and that "seeds of violence and hatred have been sown into the brainwashing song, causing people to inadvertently dance to its baton and commit bad behaviour".

The song has been described as the unofficial anthem of Hong Kong, and some protesters stated they felt that "Glory to Hong Kong" should replace the Chinese national anthem "March of the Volunteers" as the anthem of Hong Kong; to which, the composer insisted that the song can only be a protest song: "There is no nation. How can there be a national anthem?" On the other hand, an opinion piece by Brian C. Thompson, a Chinese University of Hong Kong senior lecturer, for The Globe and Mail argues that despite only a "few" minority of the protesters are demanding for a separate state, the march is used as a thematic anthem representing the collective demands of the Hong Kong people – which are also considered "a nation [...]. A state may be home to multiple nations..." – therefore the march can still be regarded as "national" in nature.

Some critics challenge the song in terms of musical theory, considering its lyrics "clumsy" and its melodic range "too wide for most amateur singers" to which its lyrics' spoken tones are not synched.

The song has gained a huge popularity in Ukraine, as for the result of the song's name and slogan was inspired by the traditional Ukrainian slogan "Слава Україні! Героям слава!" (Glory to Ukraine! Glory to the heroes!) The Hong Kong's slogan version was also used by Ukrainian protesters in solidarity with the Hong Kong protesters.

== Government response and ban ==
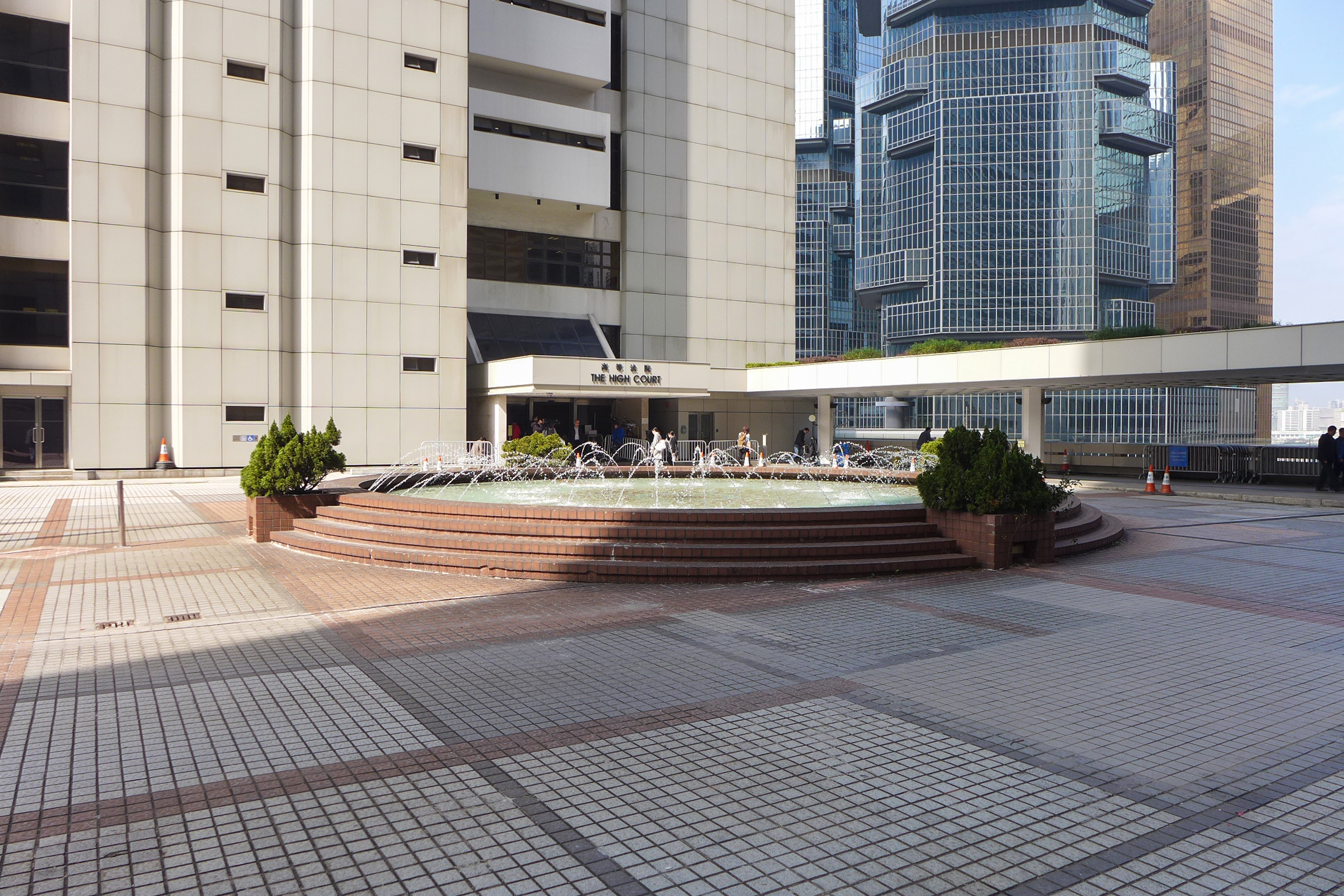
The High Court of Hong Kong initially rejected the government's request to ban the song "Glory to Hong Kong", but the government appealed successfully and banned the song.

=== De facto ban ===
Following the enactment of the Hong Kong national security law in 2020, the Hong Kong government initially remained unwilling to declare the entire song illegal. However, it deemed some phrases within as "separatist and subversive" – particularly references to the protest chant "Liberate Hong Kong, revolution of our times", banning them under the controversial legislation. Schools were told not to allow the song to be played or sung.

In practice, public renditions of the song quickly drew attention from police, and prosecutions were regularly brought on malleable charges such as obstruction, busking without a licence, not wearing a mask, and even 'possession of an offensive weapon' in the form of toy plastic handcuffs. In September 2022, a harmonica player among the mourners for Queen Elizabeth II outside the British Consulate who played the song, along with "God Save the King" and others, was arrested under sedition. A year later, an elderly busker was jailed for a month for playing the tune on the erhu, on charges of not having a permit to play or collect money, but with police witnesses and the judge focusing heavily on the song, calling it "soft resistance" and linking it to "anti-government sentiment".

=== Anthem mix-up gaffes ===
A national anthem mix-up incident happened at the 2022 Asia Rugby Sevens Series in November 2022. "Glory to Hong Kong" was played during a rugby match in Incheon, between the Hong Kong and South Korea rugby teams. Asia Rugby apologised and explained that it was down to "simple human error" made by a junior member of staff, as searches for "Hong Kong national anthem" listed the song on top. Chief Executive John Lee said that the song was "closely connected to the 2019 violence and disturbances, and advocacy for Hong Kong's independence," adding that the organised crime and triad bureau would investigate the matter. A man was later arrested in Hong Kong for thanking South Korea for playing the song.

Multiple similar incidents occurred afterwards. In the same month, a rugby match in Dubai correctly played Chinese anthem "March of the Volunteers", but on-screen graphics referred to it as "Glory to Hong Kong". Three weeks later, Glory to Hong Kong was again played during the prize-giving ceremony at the Asian Classic Powerlifting Championship in Dubai. Hong Kong gold medallist Susanna Lin – in response to government guidance issued after the Incheon mishap – made a "time out" hand gesture to signal to officials to stop the song. The song was quickly halted and the correct anthem was played after just under two minutes delay. A forth incident occurred in February 2023 during an ice hockey match in Sarajevo. Several Hong Kong hockey players again made the "time out" gesture; the song was halted and the correct anthem was played after around 90 seconds.

During this period, googling "national anthem of Hong Kong" returned "Glory to Hong Kong" and British anthem "God Save the King". Secretary for Security Chris Tang appealed to Google to correct the search results, saying that this mix-up "hurt the feelings of Hong Kong people". Google refused, saying that top results could not be changed as they were based on an algorithm, with exceptions only for if the song violated Hong Kong laws. In response, Secretary for Innovation, Technology and Industry Sun Dong said "Very well, since you brought up a legal issue, let’s use legal means to solve the problem."

=== Ban and removal from online platforms ===
The Hong Kong government first sought to wholly ban the song in June 2023, seeking a legal injunction on the song's lyrics and melody and any adaptations thereof, citing the national security law, the sedition law, and the national anthem law. The government bid was initially rejected by the Court of First Instance, which raised concerns over the chilling effects on freedom of expression that a ban would bring. The judge ruled that "perfectly innocent people" might refrain from engaging in lawful acts involving the song "for fear of trespassing the injunction which has severe consequences". The government appealed the rejection, saying that the song was seditious and could endanger national security.

On 8 May 2024, the Court of Appeal ruled in favour of the government, banning criminal acts involving the song. The criminal acts include "broadcasting, performing, printing, publishing, selling, offering for sale, distributing, disseminating, displaying or reproducing in any way" of the song. Exceptions were made for academic and journalistic purposes. According to the judges, the junction was to be effectively enforced by internet platform operators, as it was impractical to bring proceedings against anonymous online users using the song.

Following the court ruling, YouTube blocked access in Hong Kong to 32 videos of the song listed in the court's removal order. YouTube said that it was "disappointed by the Court's decision" but that it was complying with the removal order, and that it shared human rights groups' concerns that the content ban could chill free expression online. The song was also briefly taken off streaming platforms such as Apple Music and Spotify around the world, with distributor EmuBands citing Hong Kong's ban on the song. Song creator DGX Music, in opposing the removal, said that the injunction does not have extraterritorial jurisdiction. Over a month, the song underwent numerous back-and-forths of removal and reuploading, before ultimately being restored.

== Controversies ==
Anita Lee, a host of Vancouver-based Chinese-language radio station CJVB, received complaints from local Chinese residents after playing "Glory to Hong Kong" live on radio. She rejected rumours that she was suspended, whilst refusing to comment further.

Apple Daily published an article on 15 September 2019, quoting RTHK staff who claimed to have received a notice from their managers on 12 September which told them not to play the song outside of news and phone-in programmes for the needs of "news broadcasting" due to its ties with Hong Kong independence. The article also quoted that the song should be deleted from recordings of shows where previously played, due to an alleged violation of the RTHK Charter which states that RTHK should fulfil the purpose of "engendering a sense of citizenship and national identity through programmes that contribute to the understanding of [Hong Kong's] community and nation". After holding meetings with employees, Director of Broadcasting Leung Ka-wing instead said that the song was to be avoided due to its controversial nature. Responding to the newspaper's enquiry, Ng Man-yee of RTHK responded that its management has not banned "Glory to Hong Kong", has not deleted the song from its database, and as far as she knows, has not discouraged playing the song.

Lai Rifu, a Weiquan dissident, was arrested by Guangzhou police for picking quarrels and provoking trouble on 16 September. On 13 September, Lai had shared a video to WeChat and Facebook, which showed scenery around his home town and used the song as its background music, with the caption "This is my homeland, I want her to be free!" On 18 September, around 20 pro-democracy activists, including Civic Party legislator Kwok Ka-ki, Civil Human Rights Front convener Jimmy Sham and members of the League of Social Democrats rallied to the Hong Kong Liaison Office, demanding the release of Lai. The activists chanted slogans and sang the song outside the Liaison Office's entrance.

=== Copyright infringement by secondary creations ===
On 12 September 2019, a video titled "Glory to Hong Kong (Police Version MV)" (《願榮光歸香港》警察版MV) appeared on YouTube. It uses the original song and lyrics in audio, paired with scenes of Hong Kong Police using tear gas and other crowd-control weapons on protesters. On the screen, however, the lyrics "Revolution of our Times" were replaced with "Mission of the Police". Since being uploaded, this MV had received criticism from netizens which were removed later that night. Timelapse photographer Francis So condemned the MV on his Facebook page, stating that the timelapse of the night view of Hong Kong near the end of the video infringes his copyright. Cable TV also made a statement regarding clips from i-CABLE News used in the video, saying that they would retain the right to pursue all copyright infringements.

Following this incident, another video titled "May Truth be Bestowed Upon Hong Kong" (願真理救香港) appeared. It used the instrumentals of "Glory to Hong Kong", but lyrics were rewritten by someone under the pseudonym "a person who loves Hong Kong" (愛港的人) to praise the Hong Kong Police Force and to fight against "rioters". Lin Xi made a remark stating that the use of instrumentals from the original "did not give a sense of violation, and was like a match made in heaven". He opined that the problem was the definition of "rioters, whether they were those who abused their power to arrest and beat up people or the powerless force that was attempting to fight back". This MV was reuploaded to Sina Weibo by various Chinese communist official organisations, such as the People's Daily and the Communist Youth League.

On 28 September, the fifth anniversary of the Umbrella Movement, a YouTube channel named "Channel Me" uploaded a video titled "Peace Upon Hong Kong" (願平安歸香港). It was a video spoof of the orchestral MV of "Glory to Hong Kong" by Black Blorchestra. It was also re-uploaded to other social media, including Junius Ho's Facebook page. All uploads of this song were later blocked by Content ID claims by Denise Ho's label Goomusic.

== See also ==
- 2019–2020 Hong Kong protests
- National anthem
- "Do You Hear the People Sing?"
- "We Shall Overcome"
- "Sing Hallelujah to the Lord"
- "El pueblo unido jamás será vencido"
- Slava Ukraini
