= Lion Rock =

Hong Kong mountain

- 獅子山
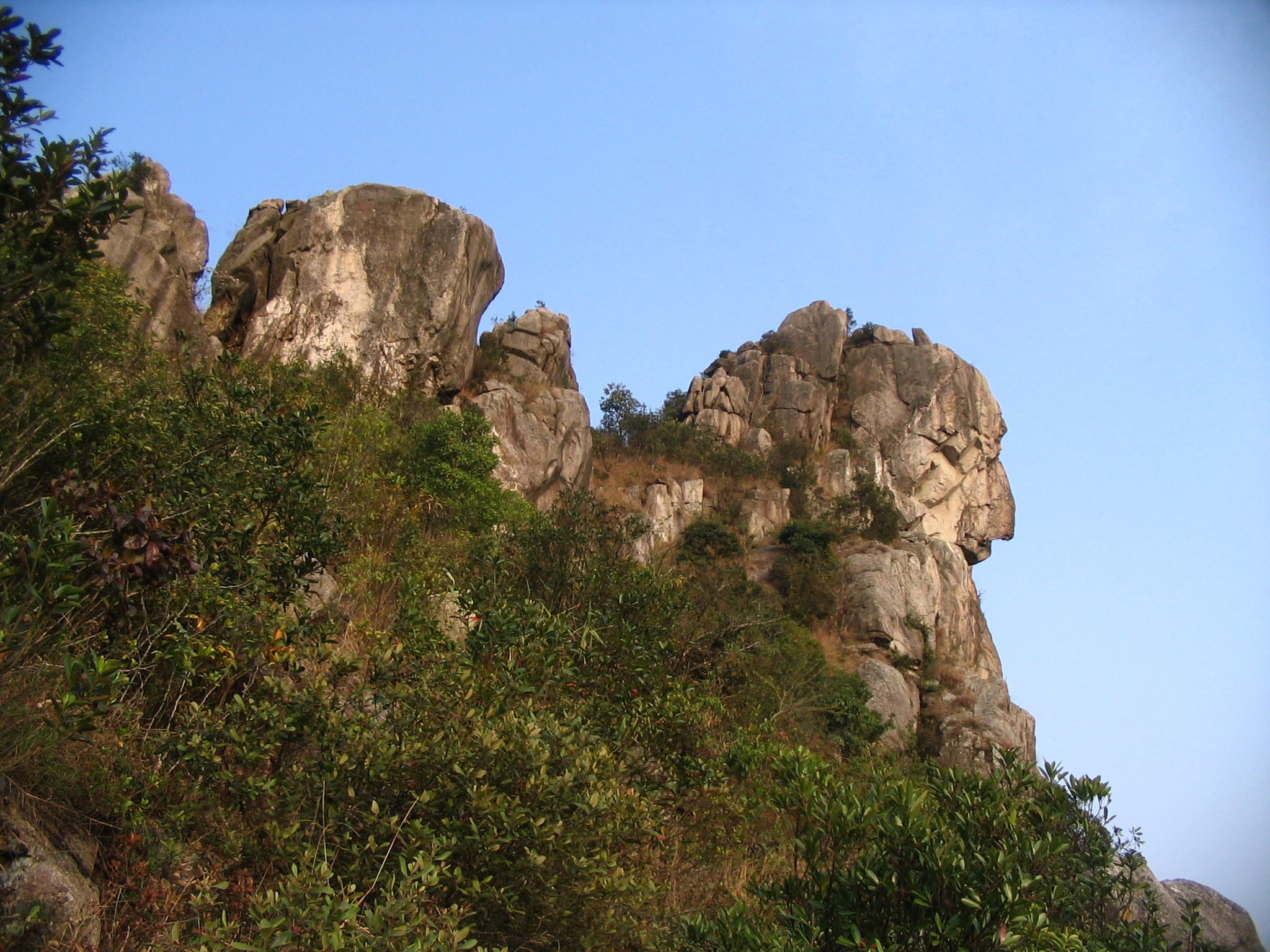
- The lion-shaped rock viewed from the west

Highest point
- Elevation: 495 m (1,624 ft); HKPD
- Coordinates: 22°21′11″N 114°11′13″E

Naming
- Native name: 獅子山 (Chinese)

Geography
- Location within Hong Kong
- Location: Hong Kong

Lion Rock
- Traditional Chinese: 獅子山
- Simplified Chinese: 狮子山
Transcriptions
Standard Mandarin
- Hanyu Pinyin: Shīzishān
- Wade–Giles: Shih^{1}-tzu^{5}-shan^{1}
- IPA: [ʈʂʂí.tsi.ʂán]
Yue: Cantonese
- Yale Romanization: Sī jí sāan
- Jyutping: Si1 zi2 saan1
- IPA: [si˥.tsi˧˥.san˥]

Lion Rock, or less formally Lion Rock Hill, is a mountain in Hong Kong. It is located in Sha Tin District, between Kowloon Tong of Kowloon and Tai Wai of the New Territories, and is 495 metres (1,624 ft) high. The peak consists of granite covered sparsely by shrubs. The Kowloon granite, which includes Lion Rock, is estimated to be around 140 million years old.

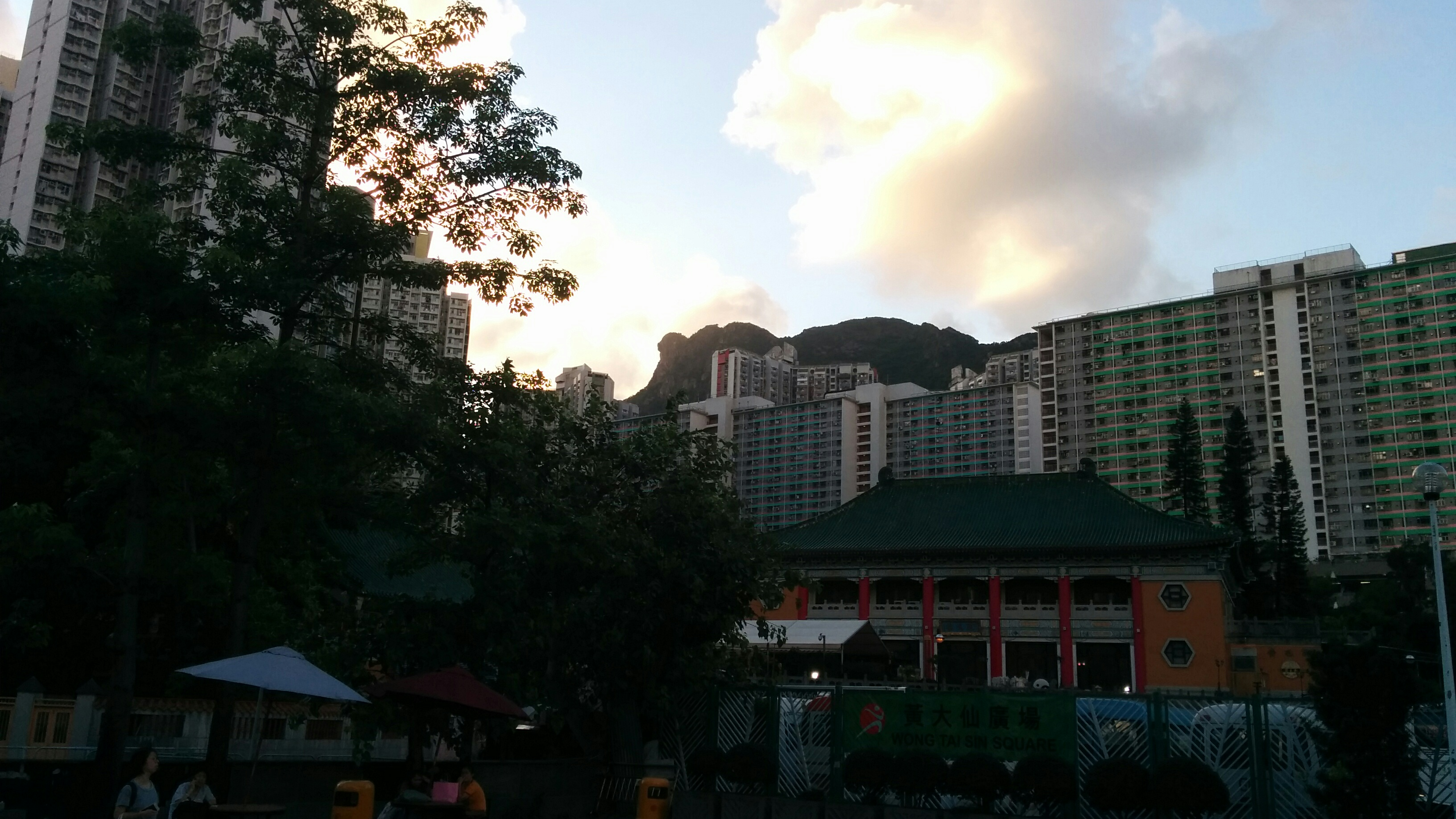
Lion Rock viewed from Wong Tai Sin Temple (Hong Kong)

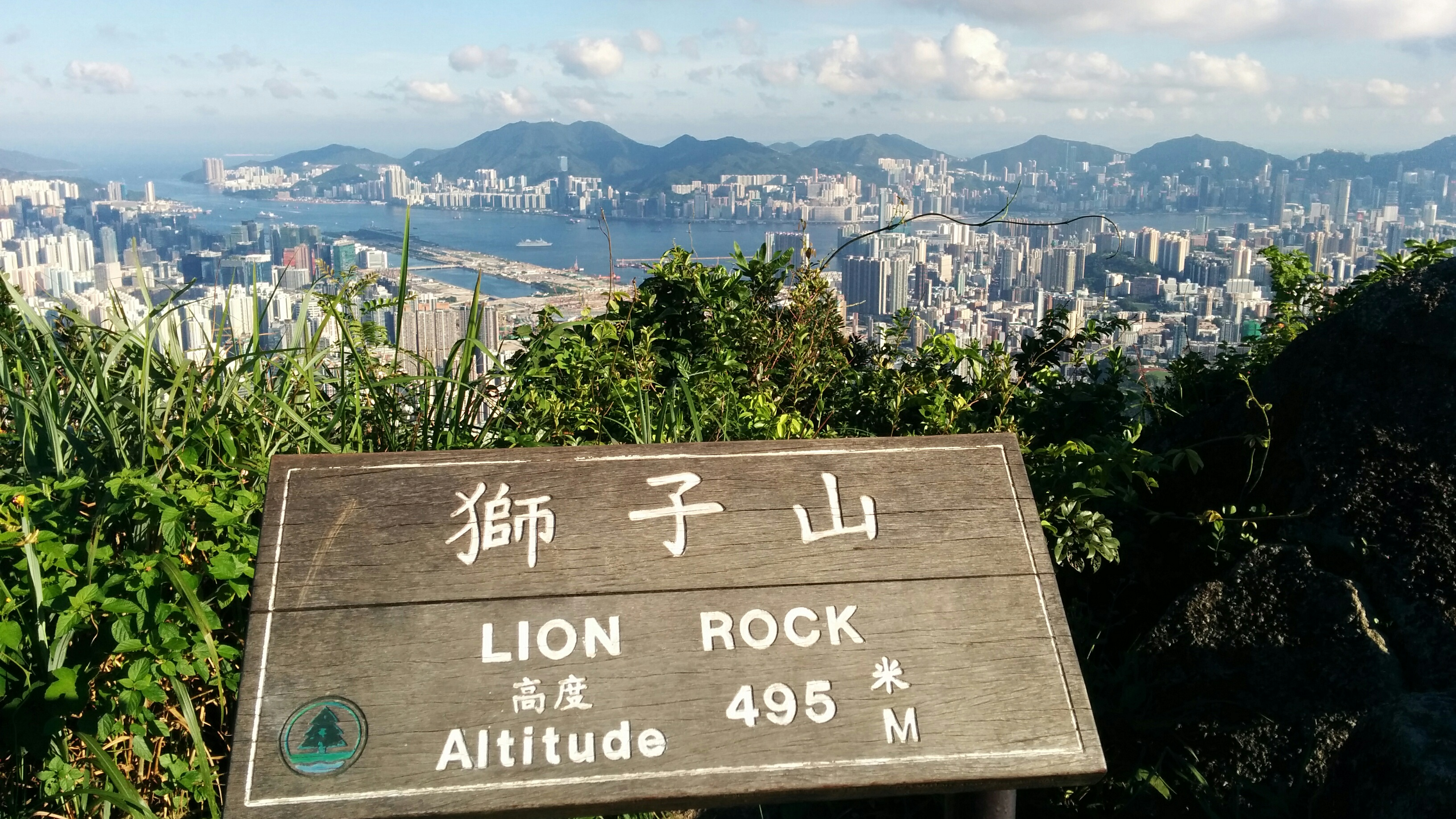
View from Lion Rock summit, overlooking Kowloon East and Eastern District

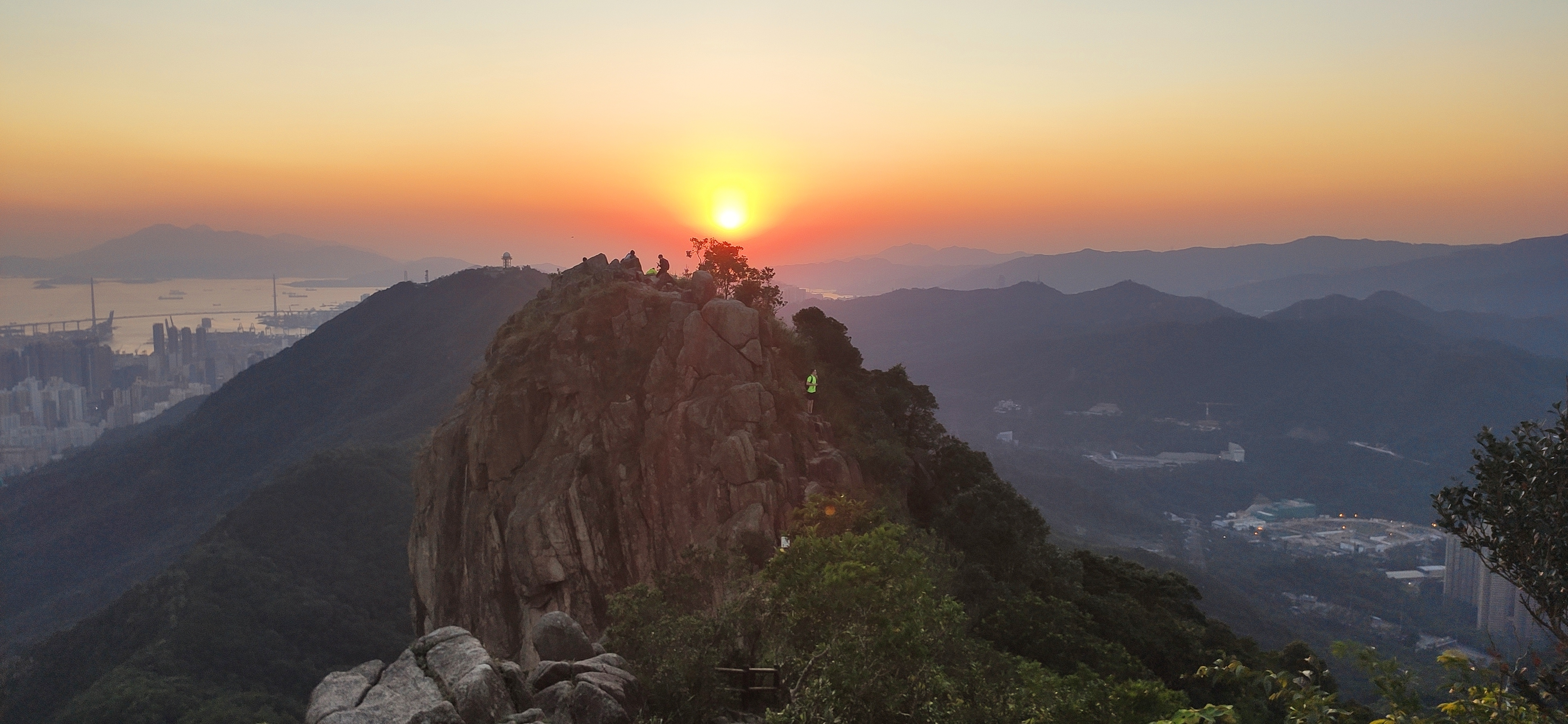
Lion Rock at sunset on a clear day

Lion Rock is noted for its shape. Its resemblance to a crouching lion is most striking from the Choi Hung and San Po Kong areas in East Kowloon. A trail winds its way up the forested hillside to the top, culminating atop the "lion's head". The trail can be followed across the profile of the lion, eventually linking up with the MacLehose Trail. The rock provides a view of the city and Hong Kong Island in the distance. The entire mountain is located within Lion Rock Country Park, south of Hung Mui Kuk, Tai Wai and is made passable by vehicles by Lion Rock Tunnel, which connects Kowloon Tong and Tai Wai.

Lion Rock is near another famous rock structure, the Amah Rock. A road in Kowloon City is named Lion Rock Road (獅子石道).

== Cultural references ==
After World War II and Communists' victory in the Chinese Civil War, many people who fled to Hong Kong from mainland China lived in squatters in Kowloon, where the Lion Rock is clearly visible. The lives of the era, during which Hong Kong was rebuilt from poverty, was depicted by the RTHK in the 1974 TV series Below the Lion Rock. The TV series featured some of the early work of now-famous film directors such as Ann Hui. Its theme song "Below the Lion Rock", sung by Cantopop star Roman Tam, is considered to represent the spirit of the Hong Kong people. The name of the series and its eponymous theme song has since been connected to the "Lion Rock Spirit" (Chinese: 獅子山精神), used to refer to Hong Kong as a whole.

The second version of the government-sponsored Brand Hong Kong contains a silhouette of the Lion Rock. According to the brand, the Lion Rock represents "the Hong Kong people's 'can-do' spirit".

A banner that reads in Chinese “我要真普選” (I want real universal suffrage) was hung up near the head of the 'Lion' on 23 October 2014 to show support for 2014 Hong Kong protests. The banner was removed by the government on the next day.

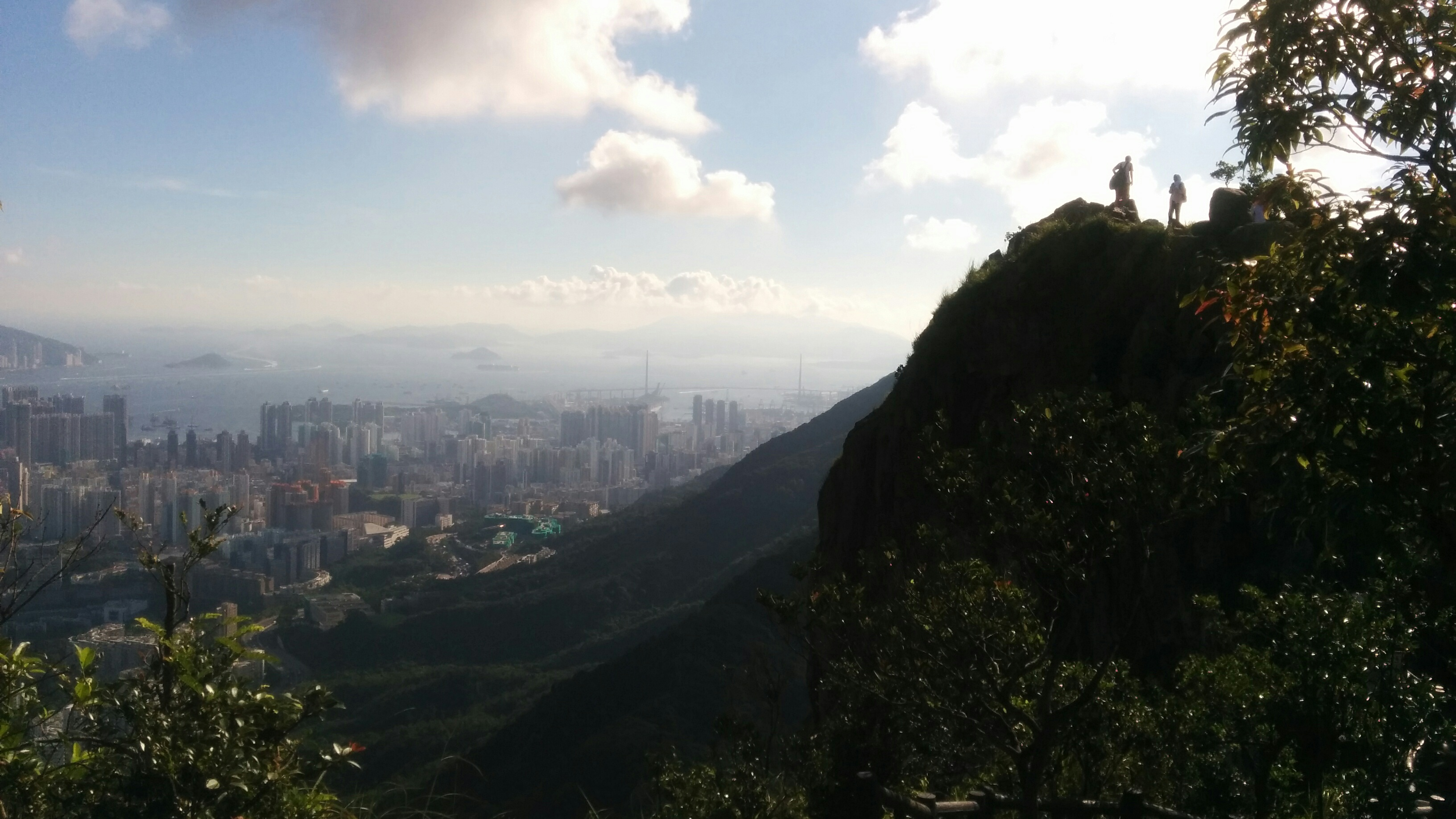
Cliff of Lion Rock's Head

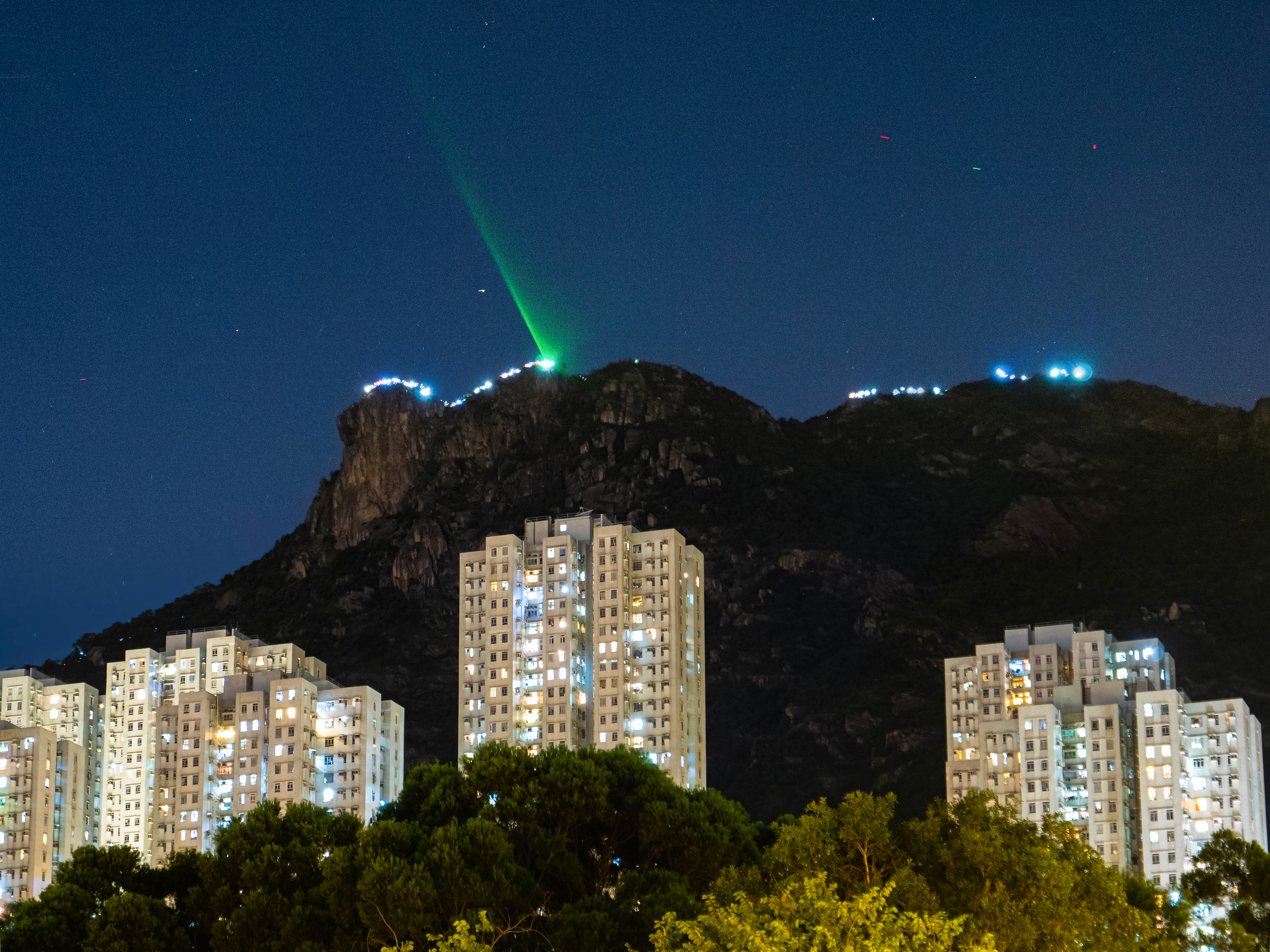
Lion Rock Human Chain Demonstration against extradition bill in Hong Kong on 23 August 2019.

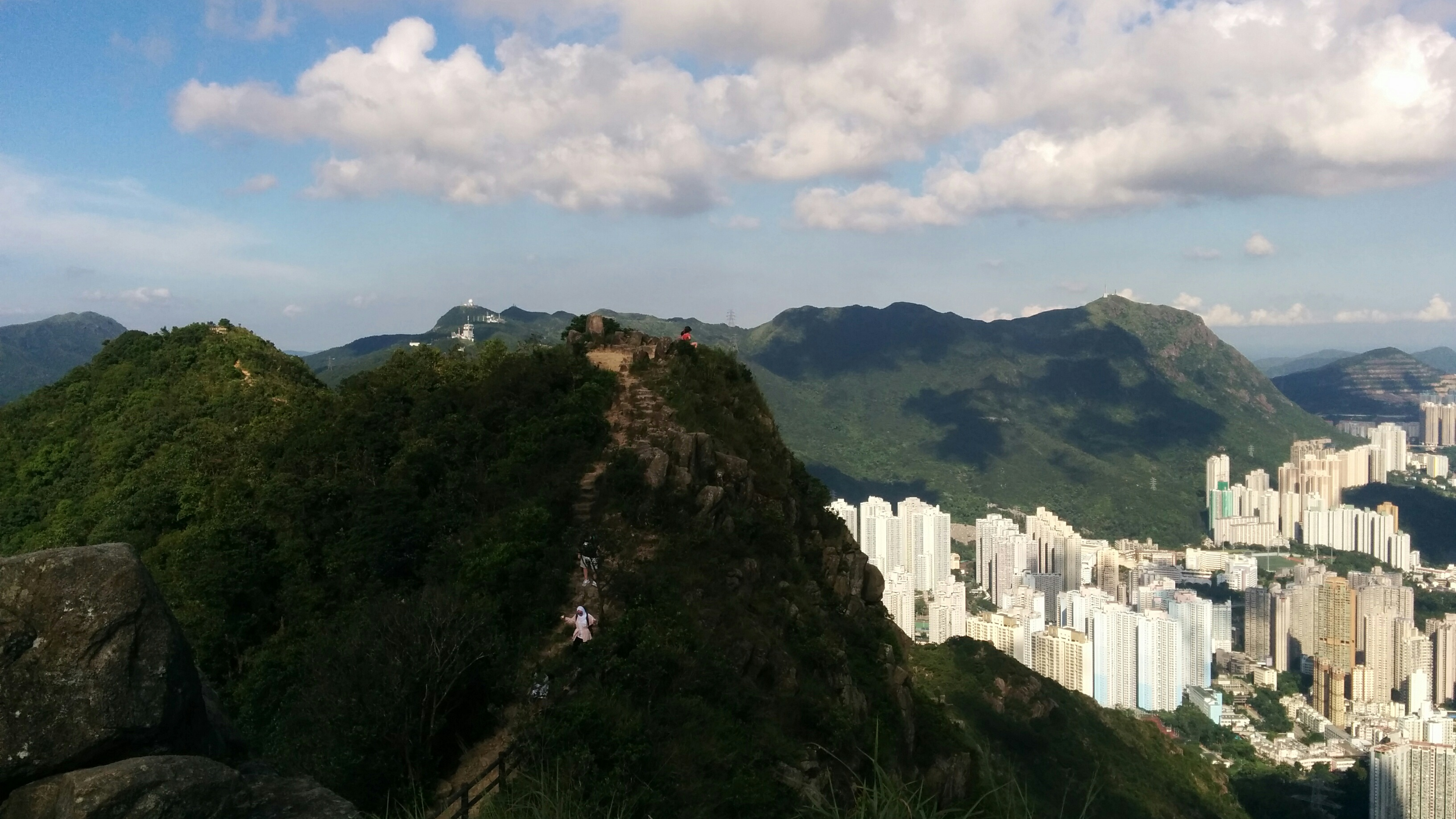
Lion Rock's back when viewed from Lion Rock's head. On the right, one can see Kowloon Peak, the tallest mountain in Kowloon

- The Lion Rock Institute is a public policy think tank advocating free market solutions for Hong Kong's policy challenges.
- Gavin Young wrote the history of Cathay Pacific Airways in a book entitled Beyond Lion Rock
- Mountaineer Sir Chris Bonington calls Lion Rock his personal favourite climb in Hong Kong.

== History ==
=== Village Paths ===
On the east and west of Lion Rock, there have been two paths built in the Qing Dynasty. The west path connects from Wang Tau Hom to Shatin. The east path connects from Tsz Wan Shan to Tsok Pok Hang. In the present, these paths are used by locals and hikers to get around.

=== After Great Clearance ===
When the ban on human settlement of coastal areas of the Great Clearance was lifted in 1668, the coastal defense was reinforced. Twenty-one fortified mounds, each manned with an army unit, were created along the border of Xin'an County, and at least five of them were located in present-day Hong Kong. 1) The Tuen Mun Mound, believed to have been built on Castle Peak or Kau Keng Shan, was manned by 50 soldiers. 2) The Kowloon Mound on Lion Rock and 3) the Tai Po Tau Mound northwest of Tai Po Old Market had each 30 soldiers. 4) The Ma Tseuk Leng Mound stood between present-day Sha Tau Kok and Fan Ling and was manned by 50 men. 5) The fifth one at Fat Tong Mun, probably on today's Tin Ha Shan Peninsula, was an observation post manned by 10 soldiers. In 1682, these forces were re-organized and manned by detachments from the Green Standard Army with reduced strength.

== Geology ==
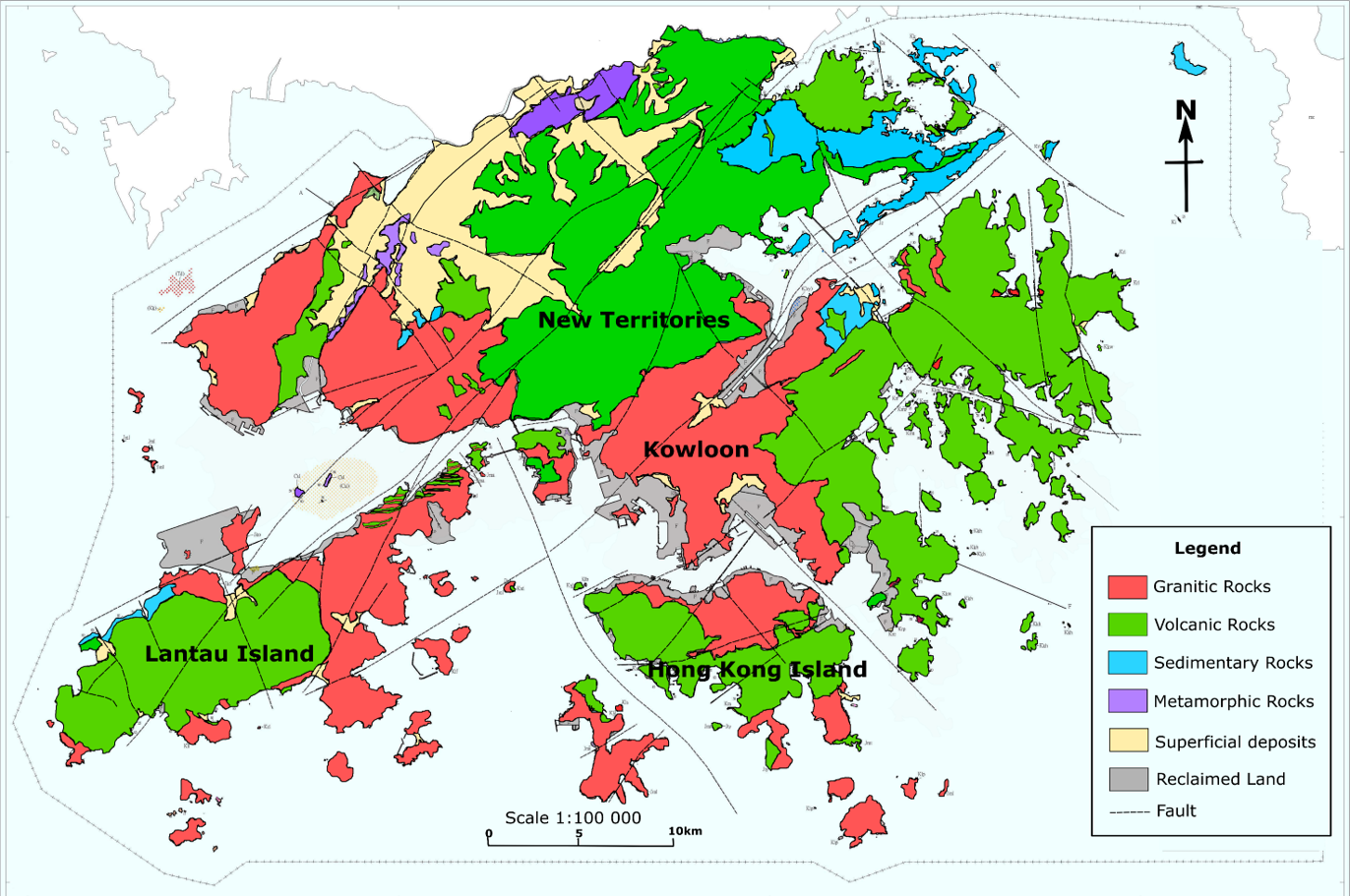
Lion Rock is in the Red area on Kowloon Peninsula.

The many mountains in the Kowloon area, which include Lion Rock, are formed by Granitic rocks. This is in contrast to some of the highest mountains in Hong Kong that are formed by much younger Volcanic rocks, such as Tai Mo Shan (957 m, the highest mountain). The lion head shape is due to weathering of the blocks of granite along edges.

== Geography ==
To the north of Lion Rock are the new towns of Tai Wai and Sha Tin. To the west is Beacon Hill (457 metres (1,499 ft)), which has a civil aviation tower on its summit. To the south is the Wong Tai Sin area, while to the west, there is another mountain called Temple Hill (488 metres (1,601 ft)). The mountain has a series of steep cliffs that separates the Kowloon from the New Territories. This barrier formed blocks the southern monsoon from the New Territories.

== Hiking ==
According to the Hong Kong Government, the Lion Rock summit is one of 16 "high risk locations" for hikers in Hong Kong owing to its level of difficulty.

A few parts of the trail are rocky and have no barrier fencing, so hikers are at risk of falling off steep cliffs. Numerous signs are placed by the Government throughout the trail to warn hikers of this danger. It is not advisable to take selfies close to the edge of the cliffs on foggy or wet days, or take shortcuts to the summit, as hikers have died needlessly trying to do so.

A number of deaths have occurred on this trail. Casual tourists who are not properly prepared should not attempt this hike.

=== Hiking fatalities ===
- On 20 December 1982, a 14-year-old British boy fell off a 30-meter cliff from the lion's head and died.
- On 1 April 2007, a 48-year-old woman lost her way while climbing Lion Rock with her companions, fell off a 100m-cliff and died.
- On 10 September 2008, a 26-year-old man fell off a 40-metre cliff and died while hiking on Lion Rock.
- In November 2011, a 73-year-old hiker fell off a cliff at the top of Lion Rock and died.
- On 12 March 2016, when a 22-year-old man climbed to the top of Lion Rock alone to take pictures, he stumbled and fell 400 metres off a cliff and died.
- On 5 October 2019, a woman was found dead 20 metres under the western cliff of Lion Rock.
- On 28 January 2020, a man fell off a cliff from Lion Rock and was found on a slope 200 meters under the Lion’s head.
- On 21 November 2020, a 56-year-old woman accidentally fell 30 metres off a cliff while climbing on a treacherous mountainside trail south of Lion’s Tail. She was pronounced dead after a 4-hour rescue operation.

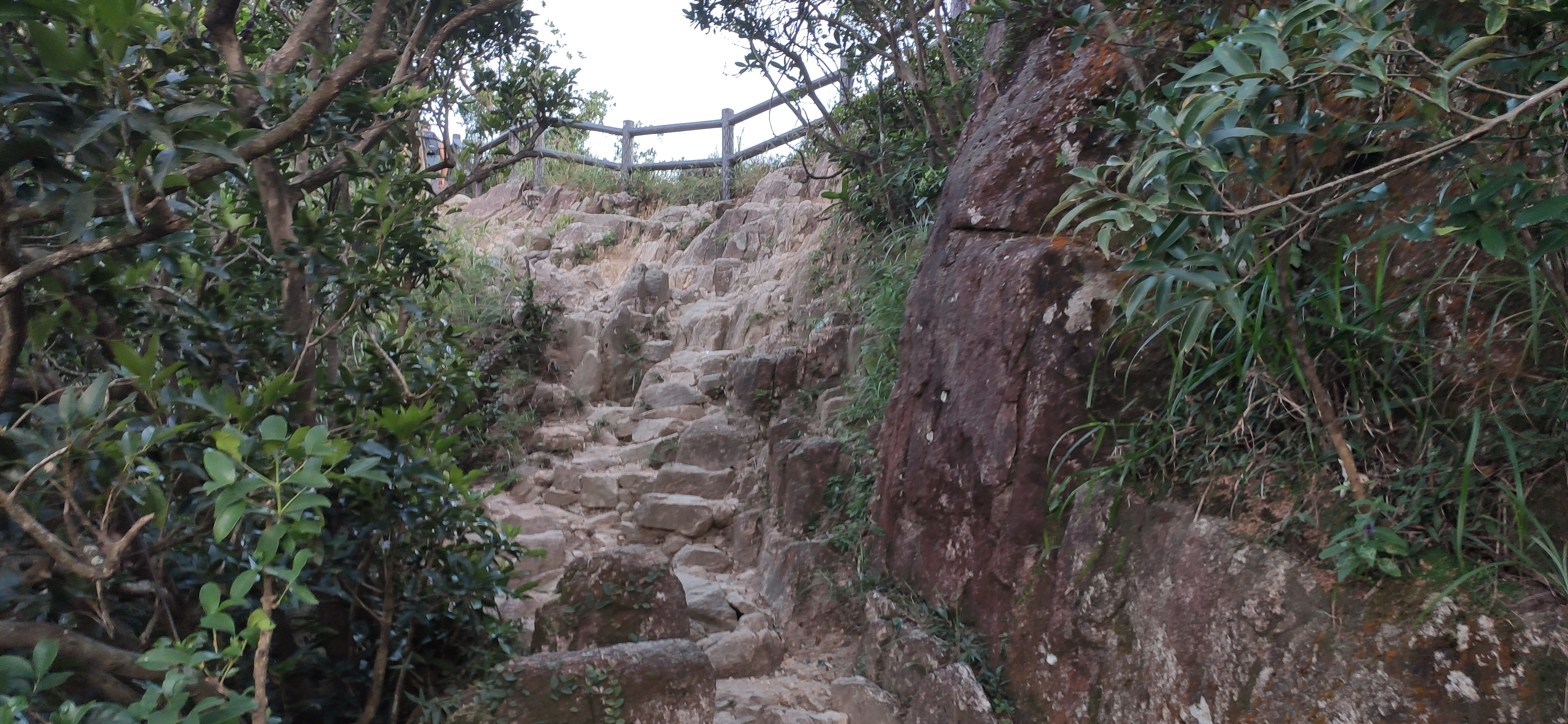
Rocky sections of Lion Rock Trail – proper shoes are advisable

=== Environment ===
- The Lion Rock trail, unlike tourist-friendly Victoria Peak, is a country park trail and has no street lights, roads or cable cars. It is completely dark by the evening. Some parts of the trail can be rocky, so when hikers go up or down the trail in total darkness, one should have a strong flashlight and backup batteries.
- Hikers who go up or down in total darkness to catch the night views should try to go on this trail first during daytime, or go with someone who has gone up before.
- Starting from Wong Tai Sin, close to the entrance of the Lion Rock trail preferred by the locals, hikers face a nearly 400-m elevation gain (from 100m to 495m) consisting mostly of stairs and rocks to the top. On a hot and humid summer day, bring as much water as possible.

== Wildlife ==
There are monkeys that may attempt to take away food from hikers as they recognize that plastic bags may contain food. The monkeys are called Longtailed Macaques and are descendants of pets released into the wild in the 1920s. The government introduced these macaques to protect the trees that surround reservoirs near Lion Rock from a vine called Mikania micrantha, as the macaques loved to feed on this vine.

Venomous snakes are active in the evening, especially in the late summer or early autumn just before hibernation. The venomous but rarely-lethal Bamboo Pit Viper, among other venomous snakes, is seen in the area mostly at night, so try to avoid stepping into bushes or thick grass where they might be lurking. The Bamboo Pit Viper accounts for over 90% of all snake bites in Hong Kong.

== Gallery ==
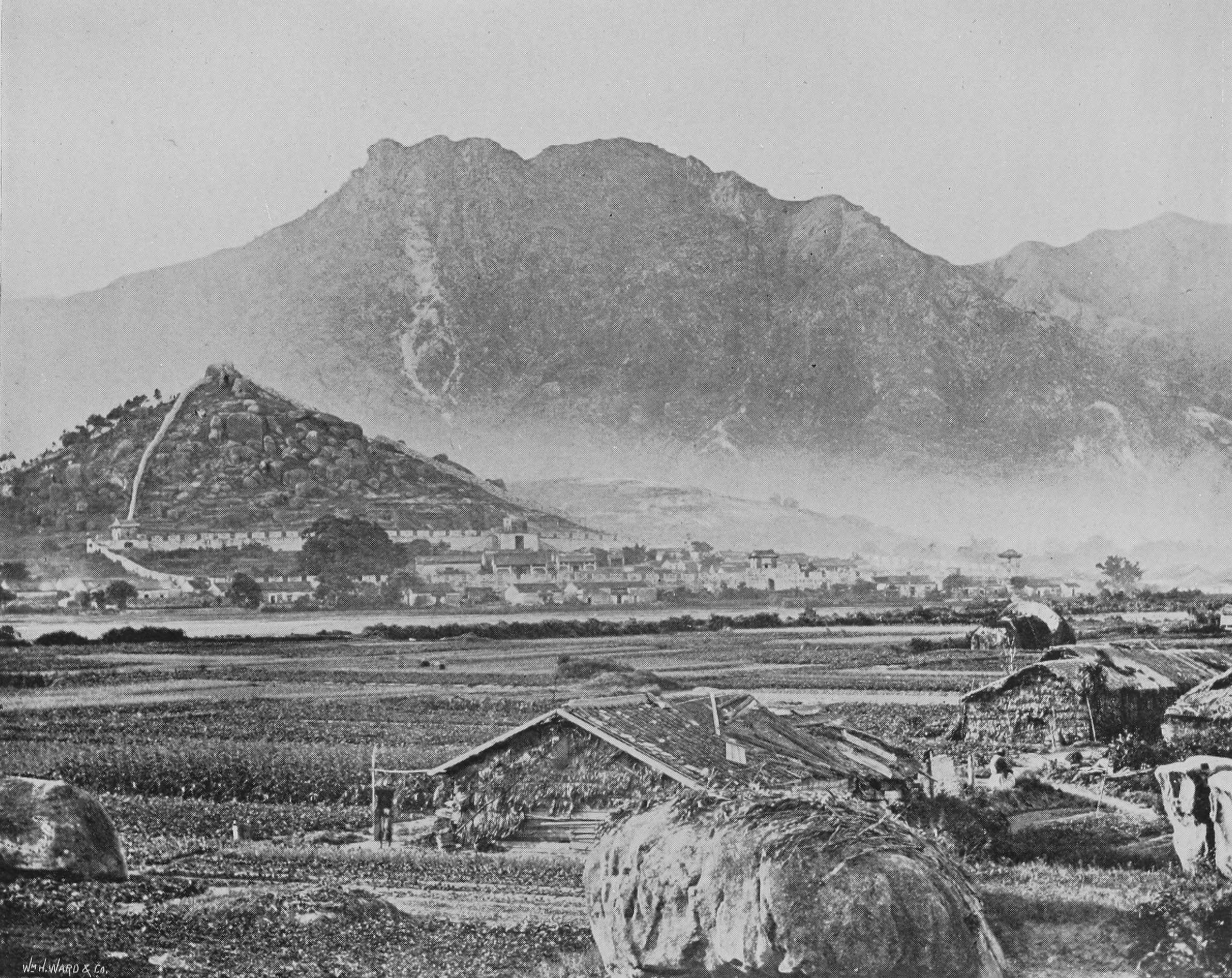
General view of Kowloon c. 1868, with Lion Rock in the background overlooking the Qing-era Kowloon Walled City

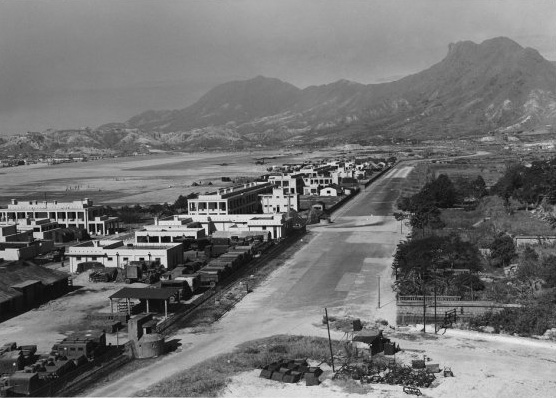
Kwun Tong Road and Lion Rock in 1945 (upper right corner)

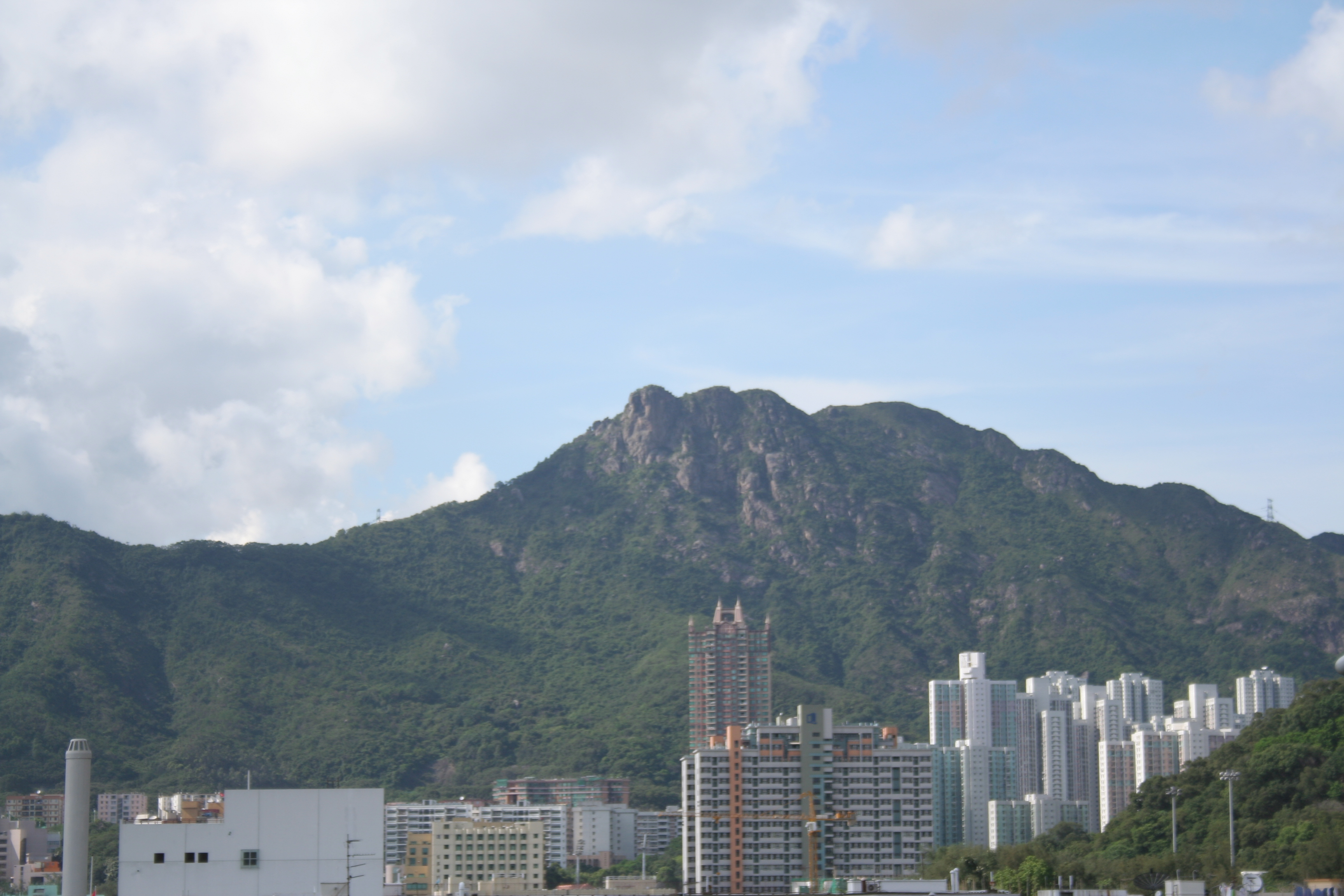
Photo of Lion Rock taken in 2006 from the Kowloon side

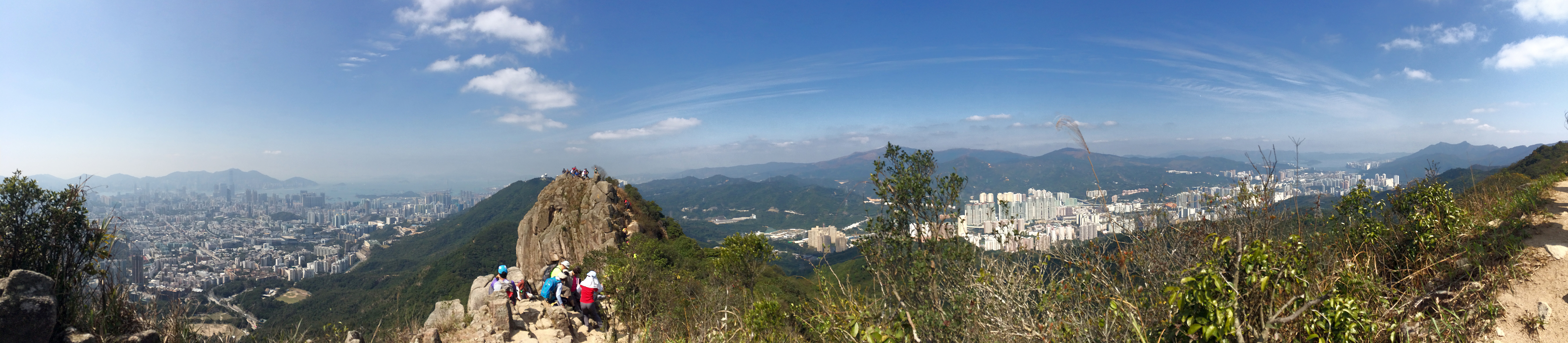
Panorama from the top of Lion Rock

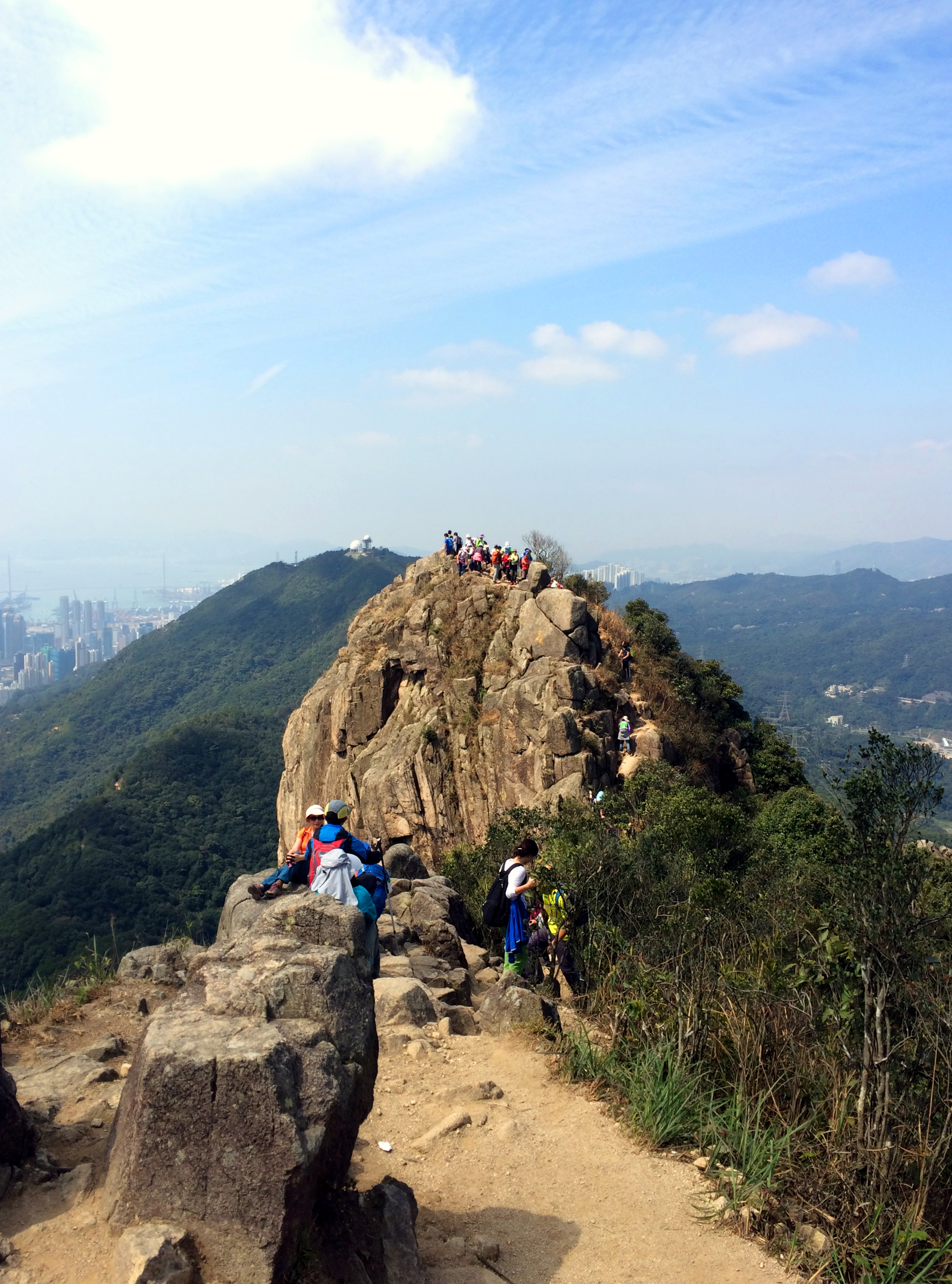
Looking towards the west

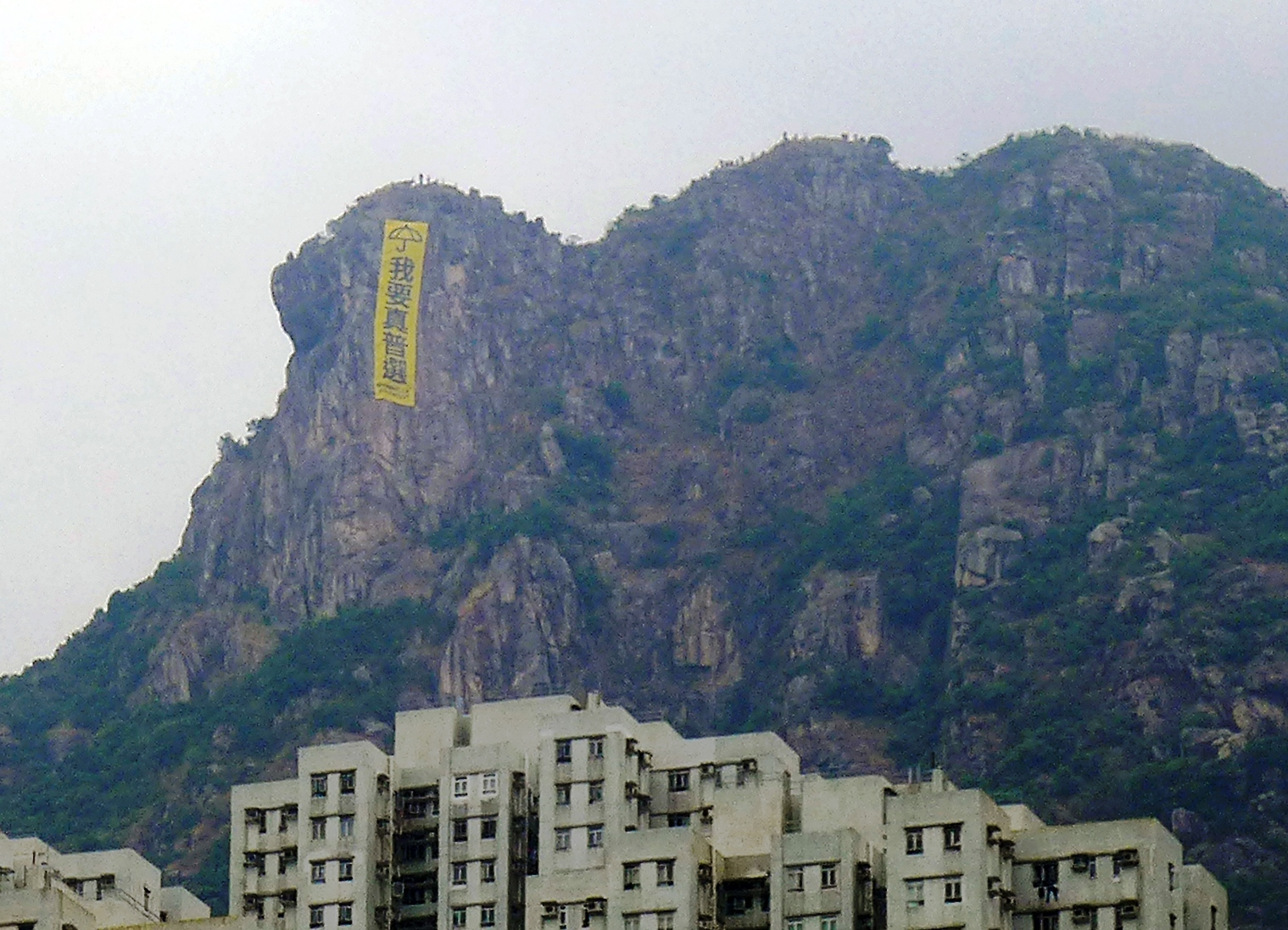
Banner hung up on the Lion Rock in support of the 2014 Hong Kong protests

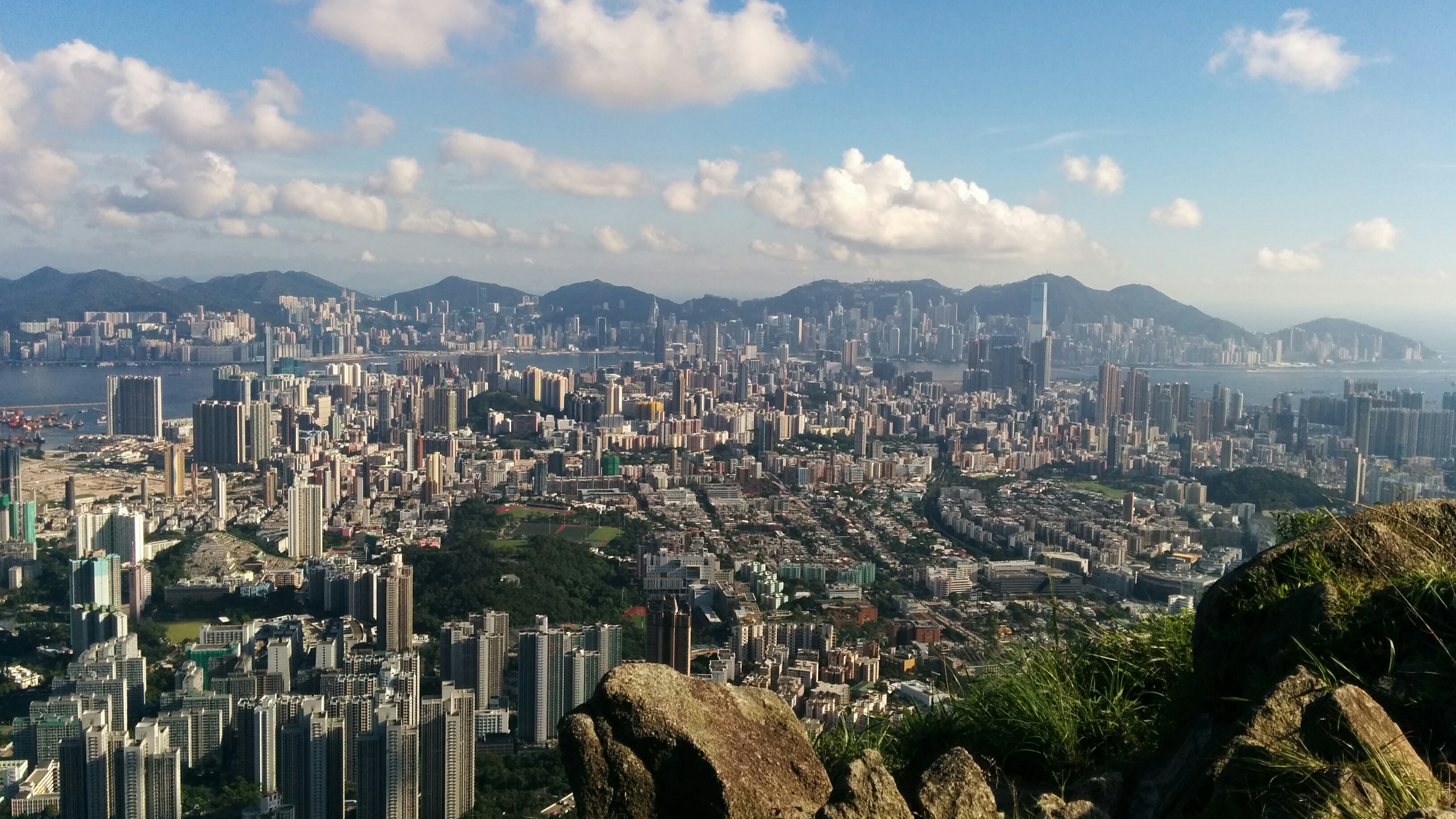
Kowloon Peninsula from Lion Rock Summit on a clear day (2019)

Below the Lion Rock (night panorama)

== See also ==
- List of mountains, peaks and hills in Hong Kong
- Eight Mountains of Kowloon
- Lion Rock Country Park
- Beyond Lion Rock, a book about Cathay Pacific Airways that refers to the geographical feature
