= Lion Rock Spirit =

Ethos of Hong Kong

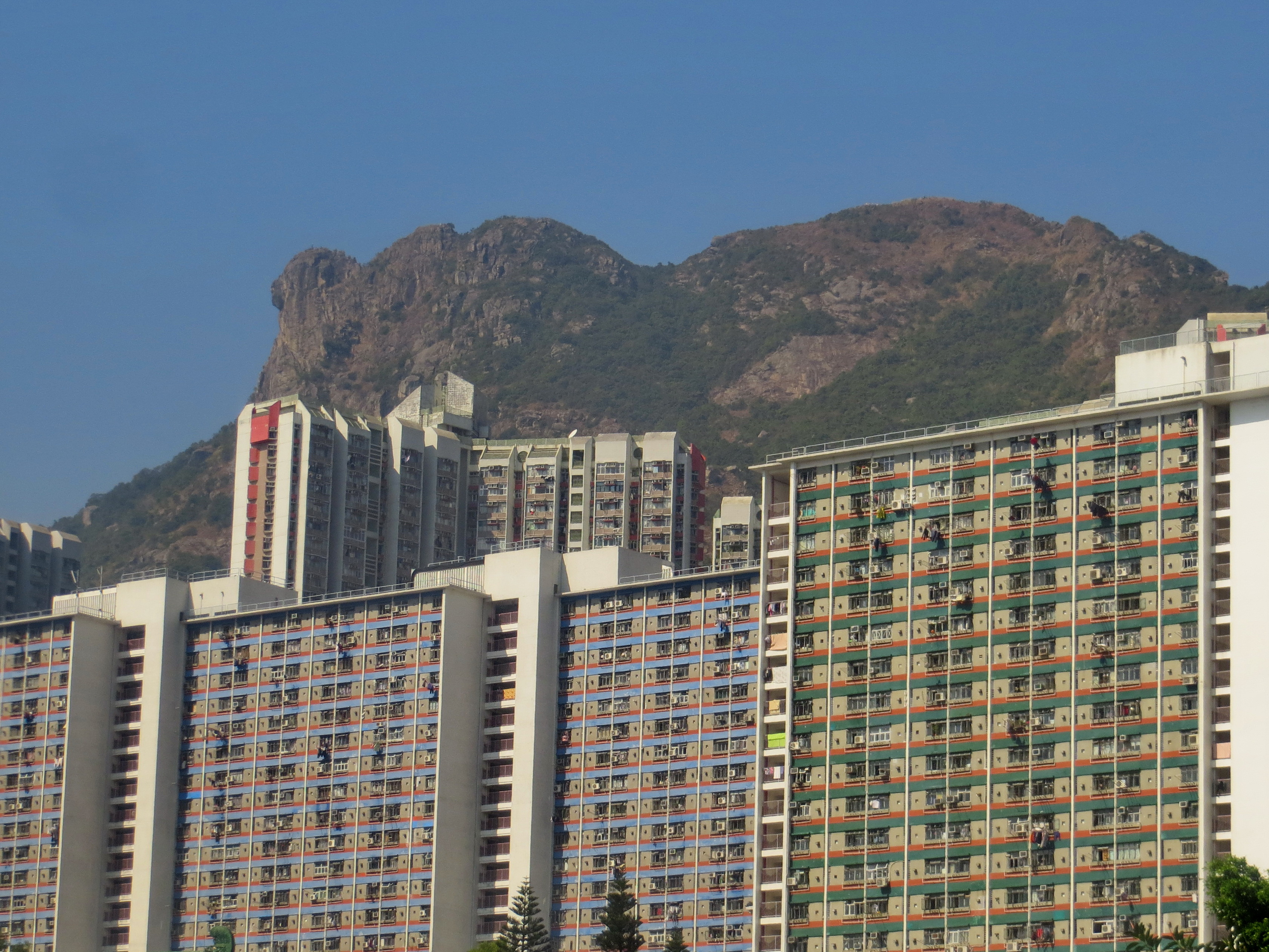
Lion Rock overlooks Kowloon's densely populated working-class districts

The Lion Rock Spirit (Chinese: 獅子山精神) is a term referring to the purported ethos of Hong Kong. It encapsulates a "can-do" attitude and a collective determination to improve life in the city amid difficulties. It has been compared to the Blitz spirit and the American Dream.

The term emerged during the 1970s with the television drama series Below the Lion Rock (獅子山下), aired by public broadcaster RTHK. The series itself is named after the Lion Rock, a mountain which has become symbolic of Hong Kong's growth as it overlooks Kowloon's densely populated districts. It featured stories about the working class and tackled sociopolitical issues. The series became even more popular in 1979 with the addition of a sentimental theme song of the same name sung by Roman Tam. Despite the widespread popularity of the series and song, the Lion Rock Spirit only came to be seen as the city's ethos starting in 2002 – when it was used in a speech by the financial secretary as an appeal to nostalgia during a period of economic downturn.

Since the 2014 Hong Kong protests, interpretations of the Lion Rock Spirit has increasingly diverged between generations. While older generations see it as a sense of societal unity to overcome difficulties, younger generations use the term in sociopolitical contexts – most notably as perseverance in fighting for democratic reforms and universal suffrage.

== Origin ==
The term "Lion Rock Spirit" was coined after the television drama series Below the Lion Rock, first aired by public broadcaster RTHK in 1972. The series itself is named after the Lion Rock, a mountain which has become symbolic of Hong Kong's growth as it overlooks Kowloon's densely populated working-class districts, including Wong Tai Sin, Tsz Wan San, and Wang Tau Hom.

=== Background ===
From 1945 to 1951, there was a large influx of mainland Chinese refugees into then-British Hong Kong, who were attempting to escape the Chinese Civil War and later, Maoist China. As Hong Kong's population tripled from about 600,000 to more than 2 million, causing a severe housing shortage, many of these refugees settled in squatter communities around areas on the Kowloon hillsides. Living conditions in these communities were poor, as inhabitants suffered from hunger, malnutrition, poor sanitation, disease outbreaks, extreme competition for work, low pay, and exploitation by bosses. In 1953, the Shek Kip Mei squatter area was destroyed by a fire, leaving over 53,000 people homeless overnight. This led the Hong Kong government to begin building public housing and clearing the squatter areas. By 1972, an ambitious public housing programme promised affordable public housing for 1.8 million citizens, about 45% of the entire population at the time. Hong Kong in the 1970s is also characterised by rapid economic development and expansion, attributed to the surge in labour force and the hard-working attitudes of the immigrants who aimed to improve their living standards.

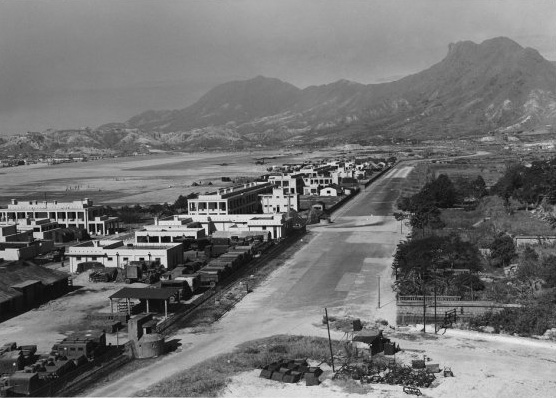
Kwun Tong Road below the Lion Rock in 1945

=== Below the Lion Rock ===
Starting in 1972, the TV series Below the Lion Rock dramatised the difficult lives of the poor in these parts of Kowloon, with a focus on "reflecting the social situation". The show featured characters like street hawkers, civil servants, reporters, and firemen; and tackled sociopolitical issues like corruption, drugs, gambling addiction, struggles of ex-cons and of the disabled; resonating with the oppressed and the working class. The show was further popularised in 1979, with the addition of a sentimental theme song of the same name, sang by Cantopop star Roman Tam.

We wanted to produce a programme to relate the situation of the Hong Kong people, and what they were thinking at that time. We did not have a particular 'spirit' in mind, but I think in the early days it was about people being poor and working to improve their living standards.

— Rita Chan Man-yee, an executive director of Below the Lion Rock

With Below the Lion Rock portraying how Hong Kong people in the 1960s and 1970s (who mostly lived near the Lion Rock) overcame adversities and collectively improved their lives in the city through unity, hard work, and resilience, the Lion Rock has since been seen as a representation of Hong Kong people's indomitable spirit. The series highlighted their shared core values, named the "Lion Rock Spirit", which has been described as "perseverance and solidarity" (逆境自存，群策群力).

== Cultural influence ==
Despite the popularity of the show Below the Lion Rock and its eponymous theme song Below the Lion Rock since their inception, the symbolic meanings of the song's lyrics only started to become part of the collective consciousness of Hong Kong people in 2002, when Financial Secretary Antony Leung cited the last stanza of the song's lyrics when announcing the government's annual budget plan.

Of one mind in pursuit of our dream, All discord set aside, with one heart on the same bright quest, Fearless and valiant inside. Hand in hand to the ends of the Earth, Rough terrain no respite, Side by side we overcome ills, As the Hong Kong story we write.

— Below the Lion Rock (translated from Cantonese)

With the Hong Kong economy badly hurt by the 1997 Asian financial crisis and the 2002–2004 SARS epidemic, Leung used the song (which reflected locals' poor livelihoods in the 1970s) as a nostalgic appeal to Hong Kong people to revive the Lion Rock Spirit, which had underpinned the city's economic success in the previous decades. He encouraged citizens to put aside their differences and unite around a spirit of neighbourhood and bonds of common destiny, as people have done in the 1970s, to overcome the city's economic difficulties.

Since then, the Lion Rock Spirit has become a cultural identity for Hong Kong people. The song Below the Lion Rock is considered an unofficial anthem of Hong Kong, and its lyrics have been referred to by other politicians to raise the city's morale and in numerous festive events. For instance, the song's lyrics was recited in a 2002 speech by Premier of China Zhu Rongji, in an attempt to appeal to Hong Kong people. Zhu said that he could not sing the song or recite the lyrics in Cantonese, but that he shared its sentiments.

== Modern reinterpretation ==
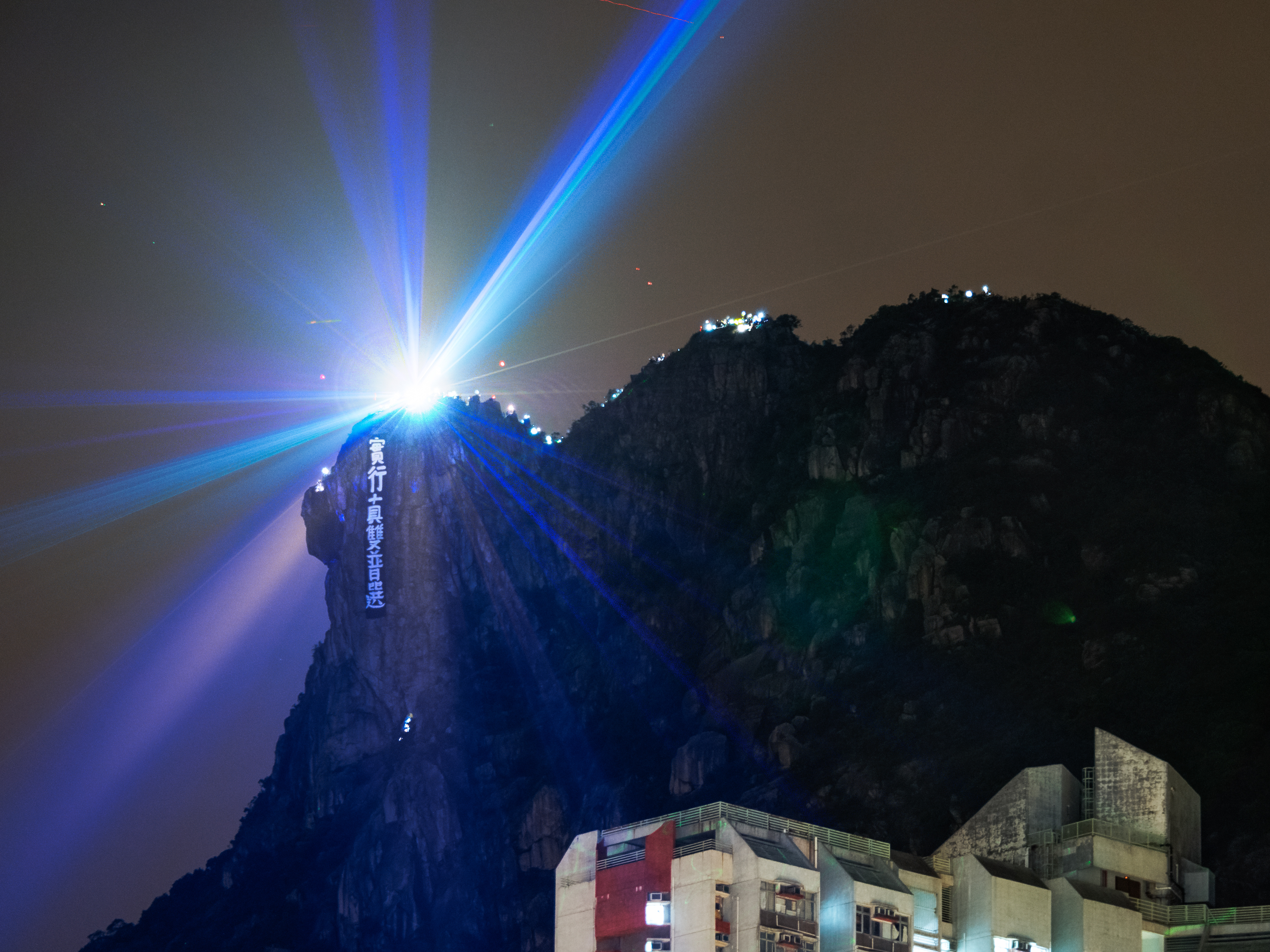
A human chain on Lion Rock formed as part of the Hong Kong Way protest in 2019. Pro-democracy protests has frequently involved hanging banners from the Lion Rock.

Starting with the 2014 Hong Kong protests, the "Lion Rock Spirit" has been interpreted differently by younger generations, who use the term in social and political contexts, notably in protests for democratic reform, social equality, and justice. The young people have become more mobilised to voice out their opinions and demands through active political participation. More young people assembled together to join protests and public consultations on issues like moral and national education, the amendments in housing policies and democratic reform for genuine universal suffrage in the legislative and executive positions. The "Lion Rock Spirit" has been redefined by the new generation through integrating the traditionally shared values of solidarity and perseverance to strive for upward social mobility and economic advancement, with the recent socio-political context in fighting for a just and fair society.

== See also ==
- Culture of Hong Kong
- Kiasu
- Blitz Spirit
- American Dream
