= Beyond Lion Rock =

Beyond Lion Rock: The Story of Cathay Pacific Airways
- Cover of the 1988 Hutchinson edition
- Author: Gavin Young
- Language: English
- Publisher: Hutchinson
- Publication date: 1988

Beyond Lion Rock: The Story of Cathay Pacific Airways is a 1988 non-fiction book by Gavin Young, published by Hutchinson in London. It is about the history of Cathay Pacific up to the publication of the book.

The title refers to Lion Rock, a feature outside of Kai Tak Airport.

== Background ==
The Swire family encouraged the author, who initially had reservations about the project, to create the book and, as stated by reviewer Michael Westlake, "apparently exercised no — or very little — censorship". The family permitted the author to view, according to Westlake, "virtually all" of the company archives.

== Contents ==
John F. Hulpke of California State University, Bakersfield describes the work as "a flattering company biography" that has a tone that is "perhaps unduly optimistic".

The book does not cover the on-boarding of the first group of people of Hong Kong Chinese origin training to be pilots in 1987. It also did not cover the floating of shares the previous year.

== Reception ==
Westlake gave a positive review, saying how the book "honestly" presents negative events, and that the reviewer "could not put it down."

Hulpke overall felt positive; he wrote that the work "is entertaining" and functions as a "'Truly Splendid Yarn'" though he argued it is not "an academic treatise".

The Hull Daily Mail contrasted the book against "soporific" corporate histories.

Rodney Applewhite, in the Manchester Evening News, called the book "colourful".
