= Gavin Young =

British journalist and travel writer

Gavin David Young (24 April 1928 – 18 January 2001) was a journalist and travel writer.

== Early life ==
He was born in Bude, Cornwall, England. His father, Gavin Young, was a lieutenant colonel in the Welsh Guards. Daphne, his mother, was the daughter of Sir Charles Leolin Forestier-Walker, Bt, of Monmouthshire.

Young spent most of his youth in Cornwall and South Wales. He graduated from Oxford University, where he studied modern history.

== Career ==
Young spent two years with the Ralli Brothers shipping company in Basra in Iraq before living with the Marsh Arabs of southern Iraq between the Tigris and Euphrates rivers. He fashioned his experiences into a book, Return to the Marshes (1977). In 1960, from Tunis, he joined The Observer of London as a foreign correspondent and was the Observer's correspondent in Paris and New York. He had covered fifteen wars and revolutions throughout the world and worked for The Guardian and was a travel writer.

== Personal life ==
Young died in London on 18 January 2001; he was 72 years old.

== Selected works ==
- Return to the Marshes: Life with the Marsh Arabs of Iraq, 1977 - travels with the Marsh Arabs of Iraq (photographs by Nik Wheeler)
- Iraq: Land of Two Rivers, 1980 - travels in Mesopotamia
- Slow Boats to China, 1981 - travel round the world by water transport (part 1)
  - US edition: Halfway Around the World: An Improbable Journey, 1981
- Slow Boats Home, 1985 - travel round the world by water transport (part 2)
- Worlds Apart, 1987 - a collection of journalistic articles
- "Introduction" to a new edition of Uttermost Part of the Earth by Lucas Bridges, 1987
- Beyond Lion Rock, 1988 - the story of Cathay Pacific Airways
- In Search of Conrad, 1991 - retracing the travels of Joseph Conrad (Thomas Cook Travel Book Award)
- From Sea to Shining Sea: Present-day Journey into America's Past, 1996
- A Wavering Grace: A Vietnamese Family in War and Peace, 1997 – a Vietnamese family in war and peace
- Eye on the World, 1999 - celebrating a lifetime of travel

== See also ==
- Wilfred Thesiger
- Travel literature
