= Below the Lion Rock (song) =

"獅子山下"

Song by Roman Tam
- Language: Cantonese
- English title: Below the Lion Rock
- Written: 1979
- Released: 1979
- Genre: Cantopop
- Composer(s): Joseph Koo
- Lyricist(s): James Wong

Music video
- "獅子山下" on YouTube

"Below the Lion Rock" (Chinese: 獅子山下) is a Cantopop song by Hong Kong singer Roman Tam. It was composed and arranged by Joseph Koo, with lyrics written by James Wong. It was written and used as the theme song of RTHK's TV show of the same name in 1979.

In the 1970s, Cantonese pop songs were starting to gain traction. Different from other Cantonese songs, "Below the Lion Rock" was not meant to be satirizing the society that time.

During the 2003 SARS outbreak, the song was often broadcast by the media in Hong Kong, and became regarded as an unofficial anthem of Hong Kong. In 2013, the 'Hong Kong Our Home' (Chinese: 家是香港) campaign, run by the Hong Kong government to boost community cohesion, used lyrics from this song. In the same year, the Wikimania conference was held in Hong Kong. Its motto, 'Of one mind in pursuit of our dream; All discord set aside' (Chinese: 放開彼此心中矛盾，理想一起去追), is a line from this song.

== See also ==
- Lion Rock, mountain in Hong Kong
- Lion Rock Spirit
