= Below the Lion Rock =

Hong Kong television series

- Presented by: Radio Television Hong Kong

Original release
- Release: 1972

Below the Lion Rock
- Traditional Chinese: 獅子山下
- Simplified Chinese: 狮子山下
Transcriptions
Standard Mandarin
- Hanyu Pinyin: Shīzishān Xià
Yue: Cantonese
- Jyutping: si1 zi2 saan1 haa6

Below the Lion Rock (Chinese: 獅子山下) is a TV show about the lives of Hong Kong citizens. It was broadcast during five periods, each forming its own series, from 1972 to 1980, 1984 to 1987, 1992 to 1994, 2006, and 2014 to 2022. Each series was a collection of unrelated stories produced by the RTHK, and depicted the life stories of different social strata set against backgrounds that are today part of Hong Kong history, such as the Shek Kip Mei Fire that burnt down the slums, and the early immigrants from Mainland China. The stories showed the perceptions people had on the society back in those times. It was a very emotionally moving series and was thus highly successful in ratings.

In the early 1970s, the show focused on one character "Uncle Tak" (德叔) portrayed by veteran Cantonese actor Leung Meng (良鳴) and his family moving into a new flat, it was only later the producers started producing collections of unrelated stories.

Directors of the series including several renowned Hong Kong directors such as Ann Hui, Allen Fong and Derek Yee.

Originally, the show was filmed in black and white, and each episode lasted only 15 minutes. It was later expanded to 30 minutes per episode. Starting 1978, each episode lasted 60 minutes. In May 2006, a new season comprising 10 episodes started to air on TVB Jade.

== Song ==
The show's theme song, also titled "Below the Lion Rock", was composed in 1979 by Joseph Koo, its lyrics were written by Wong Jim, it was arranged by Joseph Koo and Choi Tak Choi, and it was sung by Roman Tam for the opening theme song of the TV show. Parts of the series were repeated on the ATV Home Channel after the lyrics of this song were recited by Anthony Leung, the then financial secretary when ending his budget report in April 2002. This action immediately caused commotion, especially among older generations who nostalgized the series. In October of the same year, Tam died, his song standing as a part of his legacy in Cantopop music. On November 19, 2002, Zhu Rongji visited Hong Kong and used part of the lyrics in his speech addressing the public. After this, "Below the Lion Rock" song was played on many government occasions. Some consider this song Hong Kong's unofficial anthem.

== See also ==
- Lion Rock
- Lion Rock Spirit
