= LIHKG =

Hong Kong online forum website

- Website type: Online forum
- Available in: Written Cantonese
- Area served: Hong Kong
- Website: lihkg.com
- Commercial: Yes
- Registration: Optional (Note: LIHKG can be viewed without an account but registration with an e-mail address registered with an ISP or a higher education institution in Hong Kong is required to submit, comment or vote.)
- Current status: Active

LIHKG
- Traditional Chinese: 連登
- Simplified Chinese: 连登
Transcriptions
Standard Mandarin
- Hanyu Pinyin: Lián dēng
Yue: Cantonese
- Yale Romanization: Lìhn dāng
- Jyutping: Lin4 dang1

LIHKG (Chinese: 連登; Jyutping: Lin4 dang1; Cantonese Yale: Lìhn dāng) is a multi-category forum website based in Hong Kong. The website has gained popularity since the launch in 2016, and is often referred to as the Hong Kong version of Reddit.

Threads with more up-votes and replies appear towards the top of topic sections and, if they receive sufficient votes and replies, they will ultimately be on the site's "Popular" section.

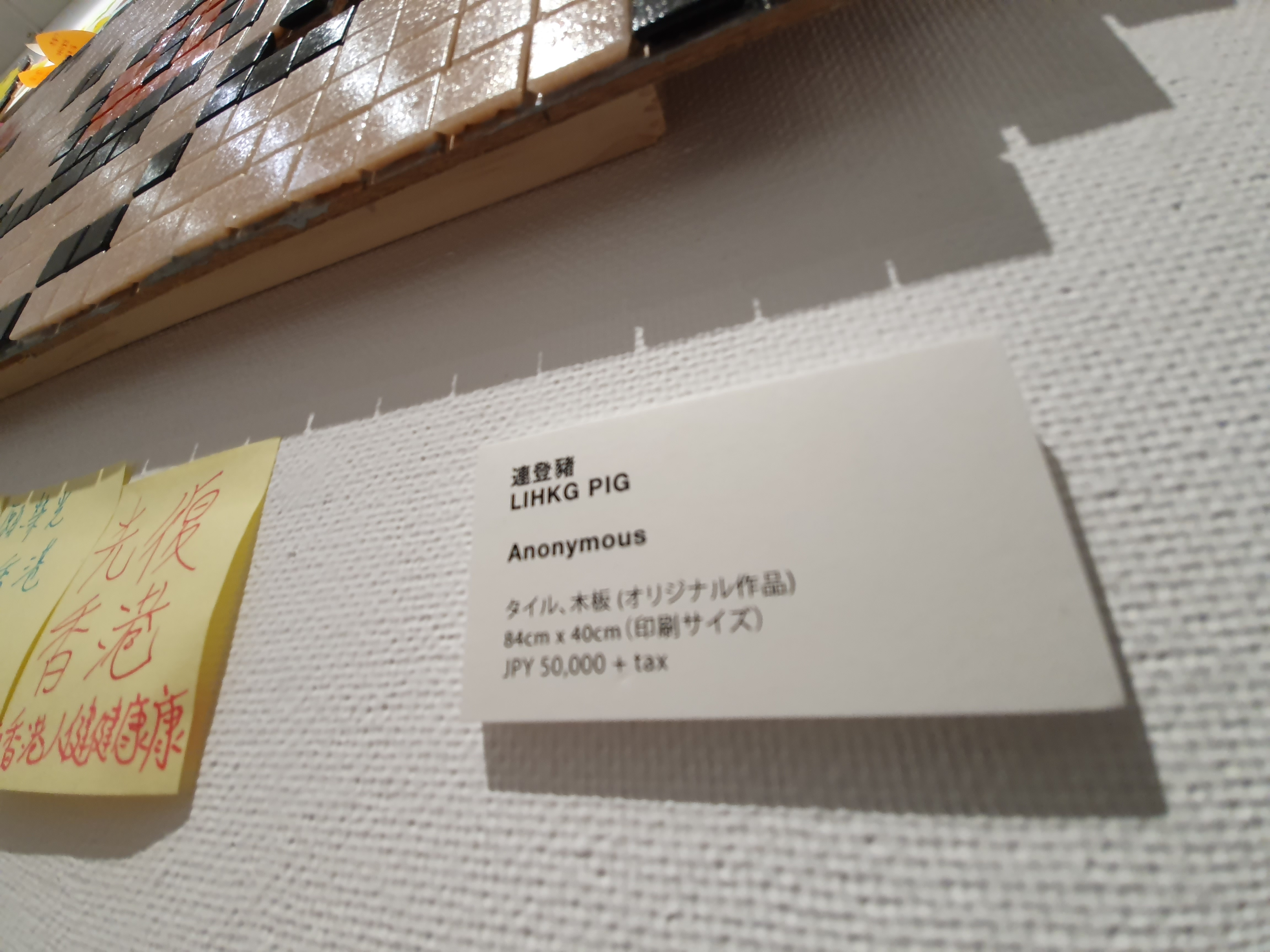
LIHKG pig mascot featured at an exhibition in Japan

The website is well known for being one of the main platforms for discussing the strategies for the leaderless anti-extradition bill protests in 2019–2020.

== Background ==
In 2016, HKG+, a 3rd party app of HKGolden was suspended by HKGolden. On 21 November 2016, the developer of HKG+ announced on their Facebook page that they have shared part of the source code of the app with another developers, Hui Yip-hang (許業珩), who is known as "連尼住" (Jyutping: lin^{4} nei^{4} zyu^{6}) on the forum, and Mong Yuen (望遠). Based on the source code, they developed LIHKG.

== Registration ==
Registration of membership is restricted to people with a Hong Kong ISP or an institution of higher education email address located in Hong Kong. Registered members may create threads on the site, while uploading contents such as text posts, hyperlinks or images. The posts then receive replies and may be voted up or down by other members. Posts are separated into various categories and are then grouped in the "Chat" category.

== Attacks ==
During the 2019–2020 Hong Kong protests in December 2019, the LIHKG website was subjected to a DDoS attack by the Great Cannon of China.

== See also ==
- Hong Kong Discuss Forum
- HKGolden Forum
- 2019–2020 Hong Kong protests
