= Reclaim Tuen Mun Park =

Reclaim Tuen Mun Park may refer to:

- July 2019 Reclaim Tuen Mun Park, a 6 July 2019 protest in Hong Kong
- September 2019 Reclaim Tuen Mun Park, a 21 September 2019 protest in Hong Kong
