= Timeline of the 2019–2020 Hong Kong protests (September 2019) =

September events of the 2019–2020 pro-democracy demonstrations in Hong Kong

Timeline of the 2019–2020 Hong Kong protests
| 2019 | | | March–June | | | | July | August | September | October | November | December |
| 2020 | January | February | March | April | May | June | July | August | September | October | November | December |
| 2021 | January | February | March | April | May | June | July | August | September–November | | | December |

The month of September in the 2019–2020 Hong Kong protests saw again citywide unrest. Chief Executive Carrie Lam announced on 4 September that the extradition bill, in suspension since July, would be fully withdrawn, which fulfilled one of the five demands of the protesters. Also, following an earlier promise, Lam held a discussion session with randomly selected members of the public on 26 September. These acts, however, had little to no effect on the protests, as protesters insisted that all of the five demands be met. That this latter goal would be hard, if not impossible, to achieve – due to the very limited room given to Lam's administration by mainland Chinese authorities, as transpired from comments by officials – did not discourage the protesters from continuing to take to the streets.

As the month drew to a close, tensions heightened further: on 28 September, the protesters marked the five-year anniversary of the beginning of the Umbrella Revolution; and it was anticipated, also internationally, that the unrest was shaping up to become a major blight to the Chinese National Day celebrations on 1 October.

Several of the protests denounced police violence, underlining protesters' strongly negative perceptions of police which had hardened in the wake of the recent police storming of Prince Edward Station. Rumours of protester deaths at the latter incident, which proved false but were nevertheless widespread and enduring, bore further witness to the deterioration of the situation in the city.

== Events ==
=== 1 September airport protest ===
Following clashes between protesters and police on 31 August, an operation was held near the Hong Kong International Airport where the aim was to paralyse the airport by blocking approach roads and crowding the bus terminus in defiance of a court injunction on demonstrations in the airport. Roadblocks were set up, and riot police dispersed some of the protesters. Some activists trespassed onto the tracks of the Airport Express line, causing the suspension of services. Protesters later retreated to Tung Chung, with some spraying graffiti inside Tung Chung station. Riot police followed, and the manner in which they stormed a train cabin was said to be similar to when the Special Tactical Squad of the police stormed Prince Edward station on 31 August. The station was later closed by MTR. Protesters were stranded in Tung Chung, and some retreated by walking a 15 km (9.3 mi) route along North Lantau Highway, towards Tsing Ma Bridge; while others returned to Hong Kong Island by taking ferries. Once word got out that riot police had been deployed in Central piers and conducted searches on young people who disembarked, sympathisers quickly mobilised volunteer drivers to transport protesters. The mass evacuation was dubbed by some media as "Hong Kong's Dunkirk".

=== MTR station protests and conflicts ===
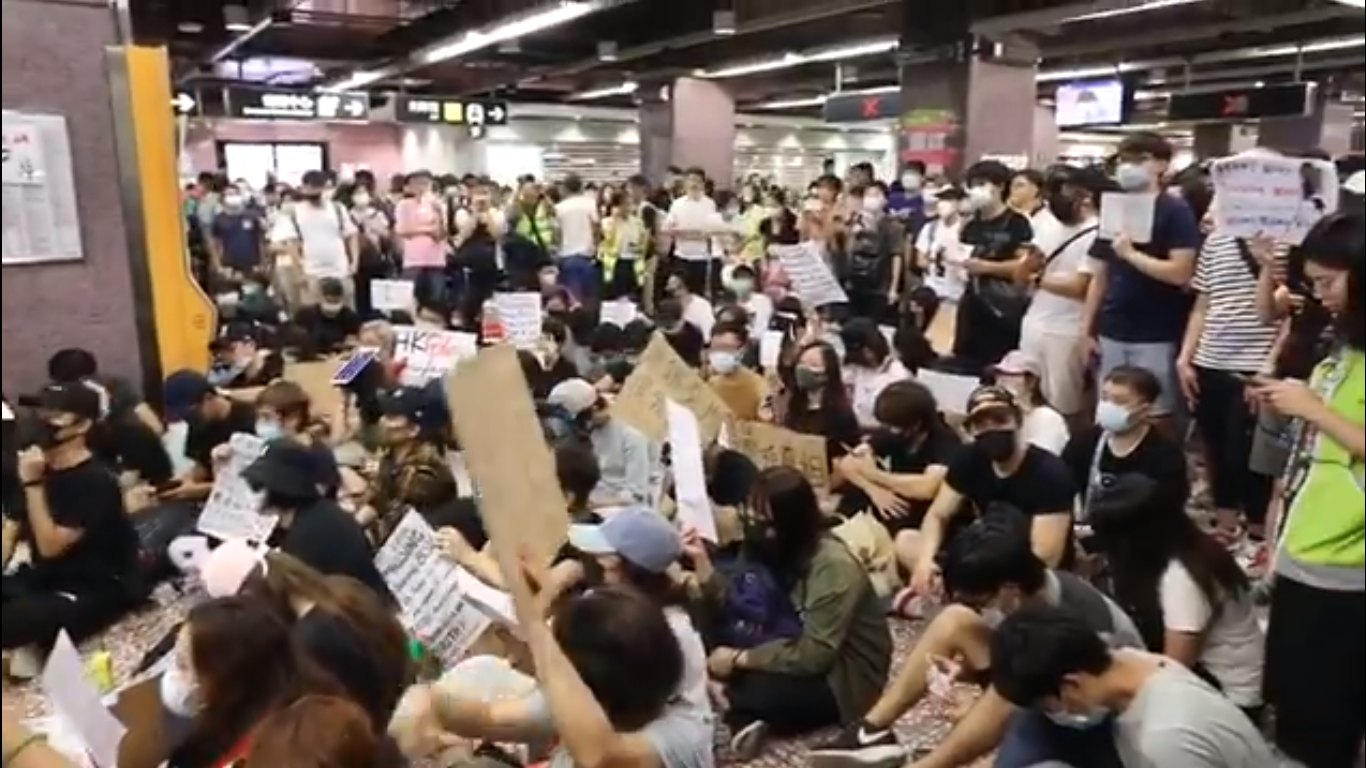
Protester sitting on a concourse of the Prince Edward station, 6 September

Daily demonstrations and vandalism occurred at the MTR stations as part of a non-co-operation movement. Additional protests were held in stations such as Prince Edward and Po Lam due to the alleged collusion of MTR and the police. In specific, rumours circulated that the police had killed suspected protesters on 31 August arrest in the Prince Edward station, thus protesters demands MTR to publish the closed-circuit television footage of that night. Witnesses had alleged that at least three seriously injured people were missing in the Prince Edward station on 31 August. Two people who claimed to be relatives of the missing people, told Hong Kong Free Press that the police had killed several people inside the station.

On 4 September, an off-duty MTR station supervisor was injured in Po Lam station by the protesters. Several ticket machines and entry gates were also vandalised. The railway operator strongly condemned the attacks.

On 5 September, tension rose near Hang Hau station when a group of protesters confronted the riot police. Protesters shouted anti-police chants and shone lasers into the station. The police's attempt to search the nearby area provoked residents of a nearby housing estate who were angered by the disturbance. On the same day, the police arrested some protesters in Tuen Mun whom they suspected had planned to vandalise Light Rail there.

Flashmobs besieged police stations as well as MTR stations on 6 September. At midnight, MTR announced that Mong Kok station and Yau Ma Tei station were closed due to vandalism, while Prince Edward station was closed due to the amassing of protesters.

On 7 September, an apparently innocent secondary school student was injured in the head at the hands of police in the Tai Po Market station and charged for unlawful assembly. According to Cable TV, he was a mere bystander while people around him vandalised. Civil Rights Observer condemned the police for using batons to hit the suspects during the arrests, saying it was unnecessary and in breach of police guidelines. On the same day, some protesters staged sit-ins inside two malls owned by MTR – Citylink Plaza, which is in the podium of Sha Tin station) and Telford Plaza in the podium of Kowloon Bay station) – demanding the railway corporation to release the CCTV footage during the 31 August police operation. Protesters later moved from to New Town Plaza and began a confrontation with the police after a protester had been arrested inside Sha Tin station. Protesters continued to place white flowers at one of the exits of Prince Edward station and besieged the Mong Kok police station in the evening of 7 September.

During the march on 8 September, at least four MTR stations were vandalised by protesters, including Central station, which was set on fire. In the Exit D2 of Causeway Bay station, police also threw a tear gas grenade at journalists despite protesters having already left the scene. The next day, Hong Kong Journalists Association and Hong Kong Press Photographers Association jointly condemned police violence, especially the targeting of journalists.

On 10 September morning, a group of unknown vandalised the flowers that citizens placed on the exits of the Prince Edward station. Two journalists were injured by the vandals when following them to a footbridge near Mong Kok Road. After MTR, the Fire Department, the Hospital Authority and the police tried to debunk the rumour regarding the Prince Edward station incident at noon, more citizens to place flowers on the exits of the Prince Edward station in the afternoon. They also declared that MTR's explanation was unacceptable.

On 13 September, it was reported that MTR planned to hire former members of the Brigade of Gurkhas in Hong Kong to tackle the non-co-operation movement, especially non-payment of travel fee. According to CEO Jacob Kam, they are hired because their inability to understand Cantonese foul language made them immune to being taunted by the protesters. Hong Kong Unison, a local NGO for ethnic minority, criticised the hiring of Gurkhas due to their language inability as well as stereotype Gurkhas/Nepalese.

On 15 September, after the end of a peaceful rally, "radical protesters" had damaged at least 3 MTR stations: Central, Admiralty and Wan Chai.

On 19 September, conflict escalated in Sham Shui Po station where a middle-aged man falsely accused a young woman of jumping over the turnstiles of the station, while the female accused the middle-aged man of sexually harassing her. The man was then surrounded by an angry crowd who condemned the man's behaviour. On 26 September, protesters vandalised the Sha Tin station after a MTR staff subdued a man for jumping over the turnstiles in the station, though the MTR staff has no authority to use any force.

=== 1 September BNO passport protest ===
On 1 September, a protest organised by Britons in Hong Kong, demanding equal rights for British National (Overseas) took place outside the British Consulate in Hong Kong. Around 300 activists, some waving the British Hong Kong flag, demanded that they receive full British Citizenship and full UK passports to replace their second-class British National (Overseas) passports. Craig Choy, a spokesman for the group, stated that "people in Hong Kong felt increasingly desperate and viewed the protests as an endgame. Upgrading the rights of BNO passport holders, or expanding visa programmes for young people, would help calm the situation."

=== 2 September demonstrations in public hospitals ===
At noontime of 2 September, staff of Queen Mary Hospital formed a chain of people similar to the Hong Kong Way. The action was in protest against police actions in Prince Edward station on 31 August, when some police officers prevented first-aiders from treating the wounded. The organiser claimed that 400 staff members had participated. Demonstrations were also held in other hospitals, including the Queen Elizabeth Hospital, Tseung Kwan O Hospital, United Christian Hospital, Kwong Wah Hospital, the Eastern Hospital, Ruttonjee Hospital, Princess Margaret Hospital, Hong Kong Children's Hospital, Kowloon Hospital, the North District Hospital, Tai Po Nethersole Hospital, and the Prince of Wales Hospital.

=== 2–9 September class boycotts and joint-school human chains ===
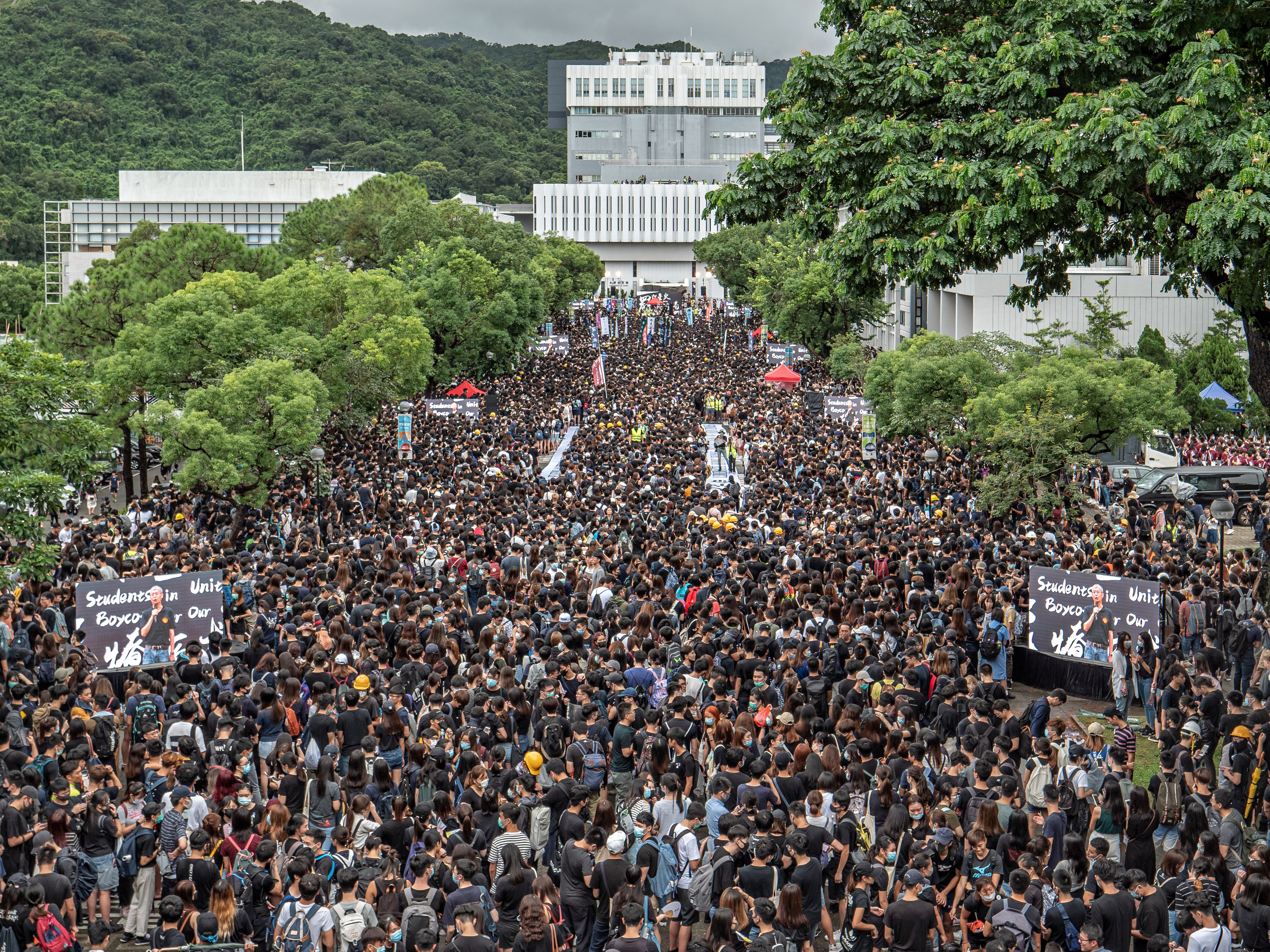
University students taking part in the class boycotts attend a rally inside Chinese University of Hong Kong on 2 September.

A class boycott was called on 2 and 3 September, the first two school days in the academic year. Some secondary and tertiary students joined protests either inside their school campus or outside on 2 September, while others joined protests elsewhere. In Chai Wan and Yau Tsim Mong, students from several secondary schools formed human chains, and held up placards condemning the police. The organiser claimed that 10,000 students from nearly 200 secondary schools did not turn up for classes to join the boycott. The organiser also stated that there would be an indefinite weekly class boycott until the government responded to the demands. Students from St Paul's College asked a retired Chinese language arts teacher to pen the vertical protest couplet banners in support of the anti-extradition bill protest while at school. The poetic literary technique made meaning translation difficult, but they roughly meant "Knowledge Comes From Freedom, Tolerance Unites St. Paul" (「得自由循知識路、容差異繫保羅心」).

The police appeared outside some secondary schools. Outside La Salle College, riot police checked the school bags, while St. Mary's Canossian College banned students from bringing protest gear onto campus, and threatened to punish students who wore black face masks. Commenting on the presence of police force outside La Salle College, Kevin Yeung, the Secretary for Education, said that police were sent to investigate following concerns expressed by citizens, and that inspections were meant to reassure. On 3 September, about 60 students gathered outside Confucian Tai Shing Ho Kwok Pui Chun College. It appeared that the protest arose from a leaked videotape in which the principal of the school reportedly said she would hand over the list of students engaged in class boycotts to the Education Bureau. Later the police arrived. As students left, some police officers charged ahead and one officer tackled a student of a neighbouring school. Two incisors of the student were broken as a result. The school denied calling the police.

Thousands of students participated in the class boycotts and protests throughout the day. A rally at the University Mall in their Sha Tin campus of the Chinese University of Hong Kong attracted thousands. In the afternoon, a public demonstration took place in the same venue. Student unions of ten tertiary institutions demanded that the Chief Executive Carrie Lam respond to the "Five Demands" of the protesters by 8 pm on 13 September.

In the early morning of 9 September, students and alumni from public universities and more than 120 secondary schools across Hong Kong formed human chains. During the event, a middle-aged man wielding a knife injured a teacher. The students of Carmel Pak U Secondary School also delivered a petition to the police after the police arrested their fellow pupils and alumni, injuring one of them, on 7 September. The Hong Kong Student Strike Alliance threatened escalation should the government fail to respond to the five core demands by 13 September.

=== 2–3 September general strike ===
A rally to kick off of a two-day general strike was held at Tamar Park. 40,000 workers attended, in solidarity with the protest movement and to pressure the government to address the five demands. Attendees alleged that a helicopter which had been hovering above them had sprayed fluorescent powder on them.

=== Mong Kok Police station blockade ===
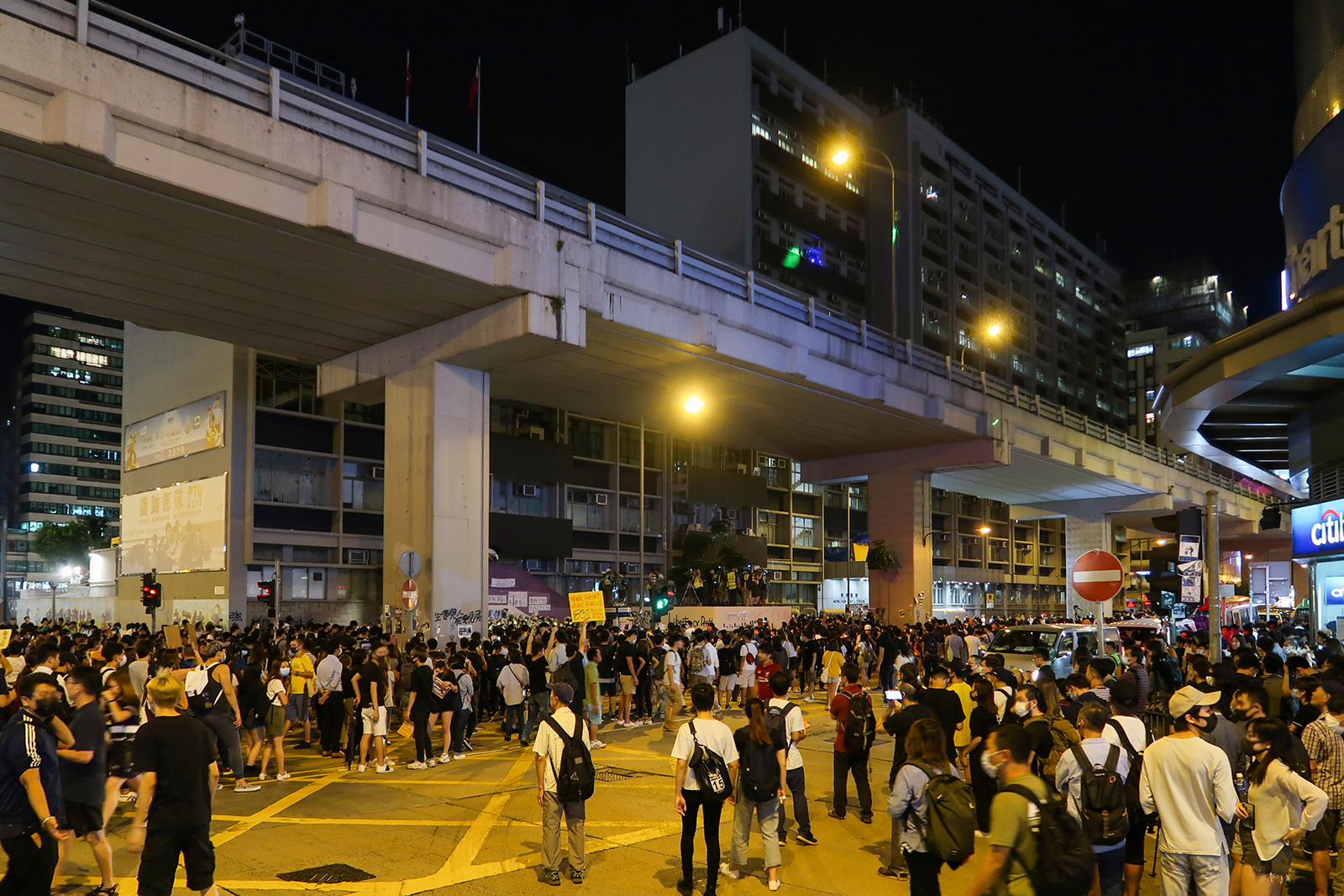
Protesters besieged the Mong Kok police station for a week, following the police's storming of Prince Edward station on 31 August.

Some protesters gathered around police stations on a daily basis in September. The police had arrested at least 2 people in Mong Kok on 2 September and several more the following morning. A protester was injured and arrested by the police after asking the police "where is your conscience?" He was arrested for "disorder in public places". The President of the Student Union of the Hong Kong Baptist University, who was previously arrested for possessing laser pointers, was arrested by the police for theft. He was freed unconditionally on the following day.

On 3 September, after attending a rally in Admiralty, some protesters moved to besiege the Mong Kok police station. They occupied a road in Wong Tai Sin for a short while, before boarding a bus. The bus was later intercepted by the police, who ordered that passengers lift their hands. In the operation, the police demanded that reporters step back 10 metres. The reporters questioned the rationale. Police officers then warned that failure to comply might mean obstructing the police in the execution in their duties.

At the same time, police intercepted and subdued two men in Prince Edward MTR station. One passed out. Passers-by demanded explanations from the police officers, who dragged him despite his unconsciousness. Some of them were later pepper-sprayed by riot police who arrived. The police refused to uncuff the unconscious protester, despite requests from the first-aider. The paramedic questioned whether arrests or saving life was more important.

On 4 and 5 September, protesters gathered again outside the Mong Kok police station. Separately, hundreds of protesters demonstrated outside Lantau North Divisional Police Station.

On 6 September, protesters returned to the concourse of Prince Edward station and demanded that MTR Corporation release the CCTV footage of the 31 August protest. The protest came amidst online rumours that police action had caused deaths. A young woman kneeled outside the station's control room to urge the personnel inside to release the footage, while others placed white flowers outside the station. In response, the Corporation closed Prince Edward station, citing security concerns. Protesters besieged the Mong Kok police station. Riot police deployed tear gas and bean bag rounds to disperse the protesters. The protesters then retreated southwards along Nathan Road. It was reported the protesters had moved to MTR stations and vandalised the properties over there.

On 21 September, protesters continued to besiege the Mong Kok police station during the Yuen Long sit-in. Protesters returned on 22 September. A private car crashed with a bus after being affected by the flashing light shone by the police. The protesters formed roadblocks along Nathan Road, though they dispersed after the riot police attempted to clear them. An undercover officer, dressed as a protester, was discovered by a journalist. She refused to disclose her identity though a plainclothed officer confirmed that she works for the Force. This is one of the rare instances where the police have explicitly admitted that undercover officers have been deployed to disguise as protesters.

=== 5 September ===
==== Human Chain Action ====
In the evening, residents of Tin Shui Wai and Sha Tin each launched a "chain of people action" asking the government to respond to the five major demands of the protests. The "Tin Shui Wai People Chain" extended from the footbridge at Tin Shui Wai Station Exit C to Tianhua Village. Most of the participants were middle school students wearing school uniforms. In Sha Tin, the "human chain action" spanned the two ends of the Sand Martin Bridge over Shing Mun River. Participants chanted slogans and held up phone lights.

==== Clearance at Hang Hau Station ====
At about 8 pm, more than 10 riot police entered the lobby of Hang Hau MTR Station, causing nearly 300 citizens to gather and scold. At about 10 pm, as Exit A was closed, the citizens also turned to gather outside Exit B. The riot police later dispersed outside the station and showed a blue warning flag. Some pepper sprays were pointed at the citizens. At 12:30 in the middle of the night, the riot police dispersed and citizens gathered again. During this period, a male passing by Man Kuk Lane was pushed from the back and his face was injured. He was sent to hospital for treatment. Local residents clapped and cheered after police left.

At 10:00, a man claiming to be a journalist was intercepted by the police for arguing about "theory" at Hang Hau station. He was then put to the ground and taken away by the police. He reported injuries to his lower body and needed an ambulance to be sent to hospital.

=== 7 September airport protest ===
Protesters returned to the Airport on 7 September for another "stress test" aimed at paralysing the airport's operations. The MTR shut down most of the stations of the Airport Express line with the exception of Hong Kong station and Airport station. The police stopped buses near Lantau Link Toll Plaza to search the commuters for offensive weapons, resulting in a long queue of buses waiting to enter Lantau Island. A commuter have described the police's search as "disruptive". A standoff between the commuters and the police occurred inside Tung Chung station after riot police were found stationing there.

=== 8 September march ===
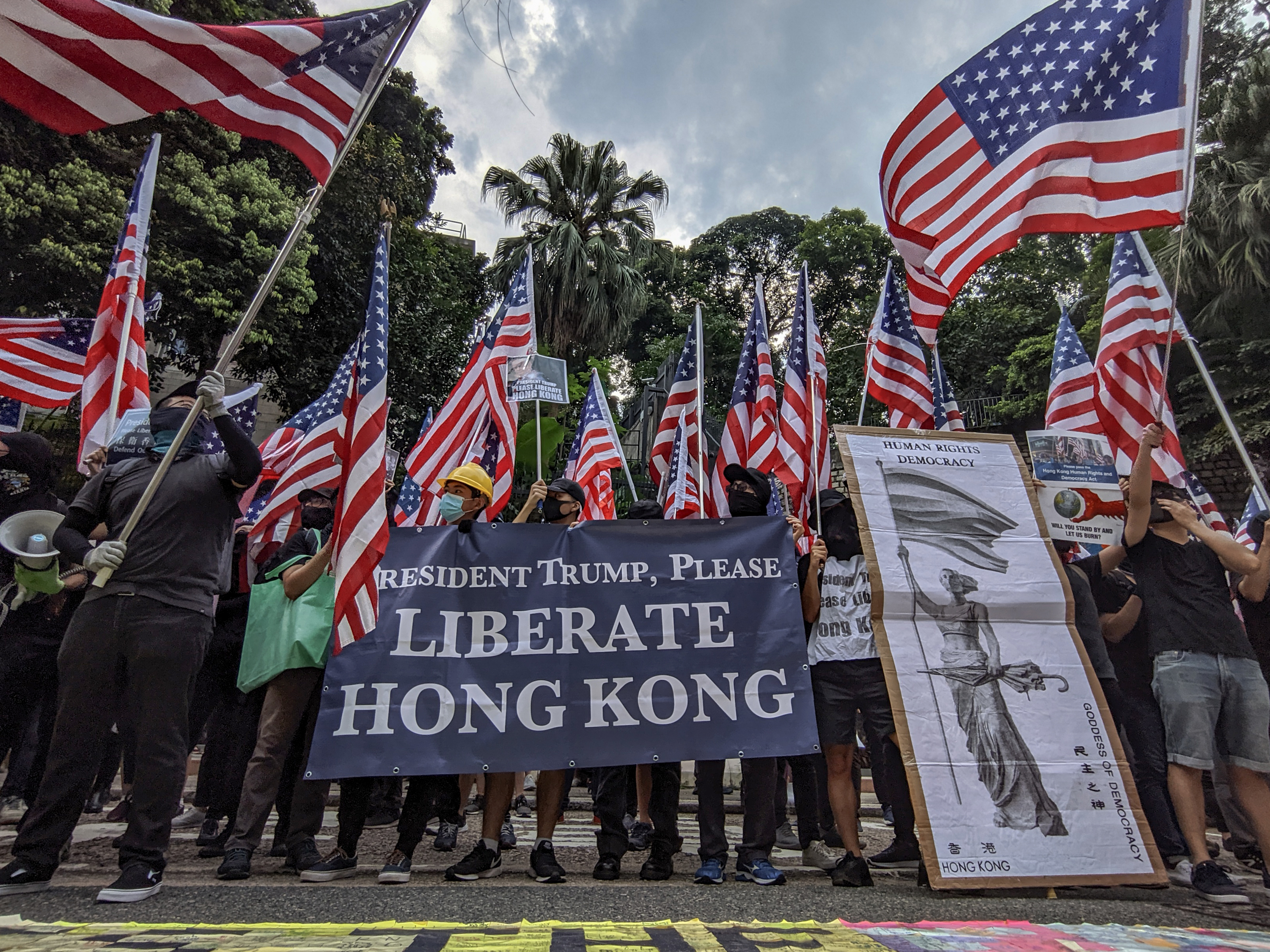
Protesters marched to the US consulate on 8 September

On 8 September, thousands of protesters marched peacefully from Chater Garden to areas near the US consulate to support for the US Congress's reintroduction of the Hong Kong Human Rights and Democracy Act. Protesters chanted slogans in English and Cantonese, waved the US flag, sang the US national anthem "The Star-Spangled Banner" and displayed placards urging the Congress to pass the Act and president Donald Trump to "liberate" the city. Near 4 pm, riot police arrested three individuals inside the Central station, angering nearby protesters. This prompted MTR to close the station. Protesters then smashed the glass wall of the station of the exit and started a fire outside. The protesters then retreated to Causeway Bay, some of which vandalised the stations, while the police deployed tear gas against protesters. Meanwhile, protesters continued to besiege the Mong Kok police station, and the police began a brief confrontations with the residents near Whampoa station.

The Hong Kong SAR government responded by saying that the US or any foreign legislature should not meddle with its affairs.

=== 11–30 September Protest anthem chants and singing ===
On 10 September, protesters defied the Chinese law by booing China's national anthem before a football World Cup qualifier and sang the protest anthem "Glory to Hong Kong" instead. On the night of 11 September, thousands of protesters gathered in many shopping malls all over Hong Kong, chanting and singing "Glory to Hong Kong". Amoy Plaza in Kowloon Bay, IFC Mall in Central, Plaza Hollywood in Diamond Hill, Festival Walk in Kowloon Tong, Moko in Mong Kok, and others in Causeway Bay and Sha Tin saw scenes of chants and singing of the protest anthem Glory to Hong Kong, which became the protest's new unofficial anthem. Since then, protesters have been gathering in various shopping malls to sing and chant. In some instances there have been clashes and arguments between protesters and counter-protesters.

On 12 September, Beacon Hill saw another vertical protest banner. This banner attempted to reverse the government narrative. Made out of black color fabric, this 30-meter long banner showed the phrase "The Rioters Are None Other Than The Black Cops" (「黑警才是暴徒」).

=== 12–14 September pro-Beijing demonstrations ===
On 12 September around 1000 pro-Beijing supporters gathered at the IFC shopping mall to sing the Chinese Anthem. Also 100 supporters from the Defend Hong Kong Campaign rallied outside Court of Final Appeal, stating that judges allegedly have helped offenders by bailing them. They also demanded the resignation of Chief Justice Geoffrey Ma Tao-li. They carried signs with the words: "Police arrest people, the courts release people". However Carrie Lam, the Hong Kong Bar Association and the Law Society responded by saying judges were just following the law and that the rule of law and judicial independence were core values of Hong Kong, therefore there would be no justification to apply pressure on judges.

On 14 September, around 100 pro-Beijing supporters climbed Lion Rock in the morning to wave the Chinese and Hong Kong flag.

=== 13 September Mid-Autumn Festival human chains ===
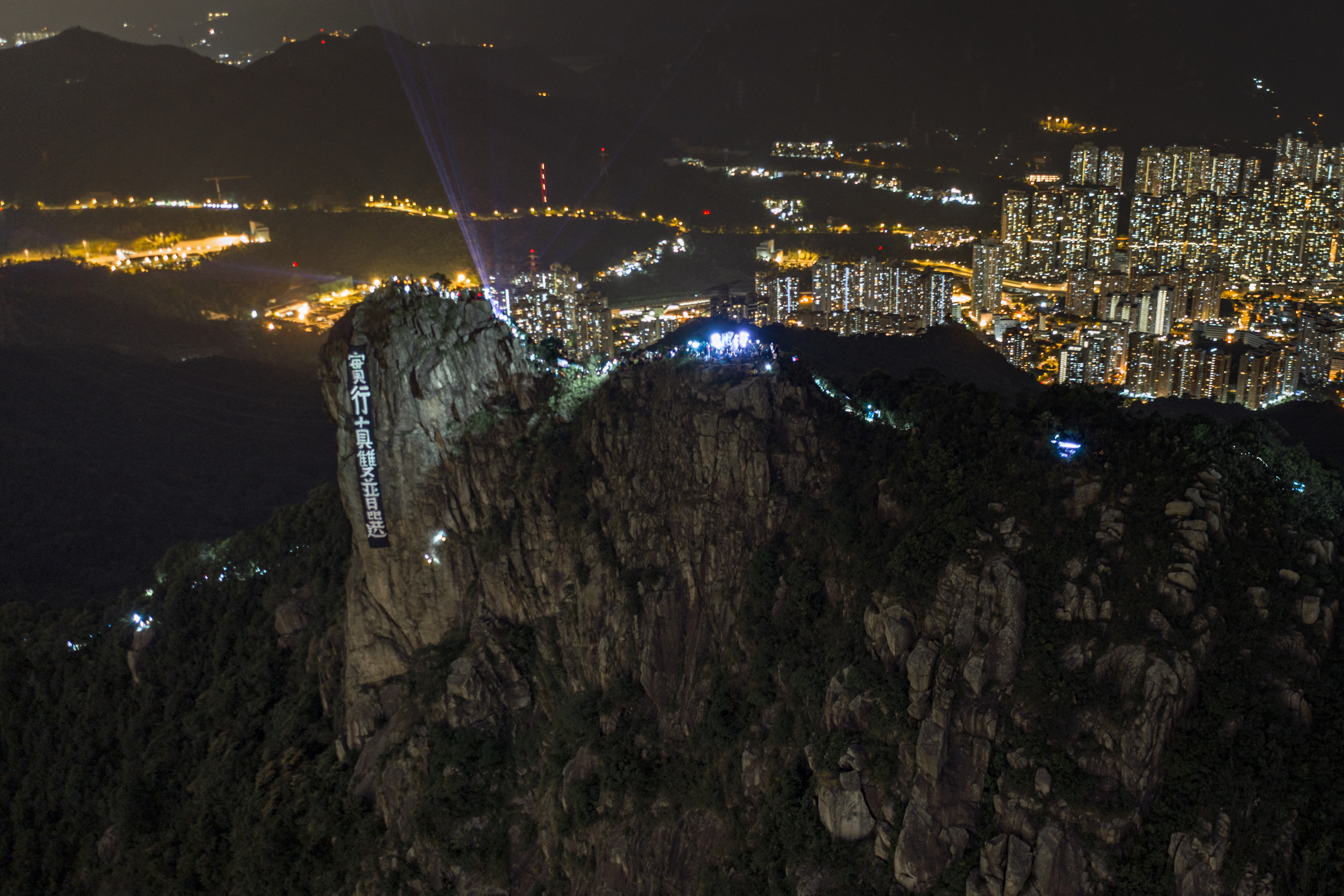
Protesters formed human chain on Lion Rock on 13 September.

Coinciding with the traditional Mid-Autumn Festival, protesters hiked up Lion Rock in Kowloon and went up to Victoria Peak on Hong Kong Island to form two human chains and light the sky of Hong Kong with torches and laser pens. Demonstrators also gathered in various parks in Hong Kong and near Lai Chi Kok Detention Centre, where the arrested detainees were held, to display lanterns marked with pro-democracy messages, sing the protest anthem "Glory to Hong Kong" and chant slogans.

Three hilltop vertical protest banners were found today separately in Hong Kong Island and in Kowloon. Two banners were erected on Kowloon Peak. The longer one was black with white font that stated in Chinese "Begin Independent Investigation" (「展開獨立調查」), referring to police brutality, while the shorter one was yellow with black font that demanded "Sanction Corrupted Cops" (「制裁黑警」). The banner found on Victoria Peak had a dimension of 15 meters by 2 metres. Several Facebook users took photographs of the banner, black-in-white-font, with Chinese phrase "Drop Riot Charges" (「撤銷暴動控罪」) but news outlets did not report the wordings or the colours.

=== 14 September Lennon Walls conflicts and clashes ===
In the early morning of 14 September, a group of pro-Beijing citizens arrived to clear the Lennon Wall set up by protesters and attacked a passer-by in Hang Hau. Another conflict followed soon after near Fortress Hill station, where a group of citizens wearing the blue "I love HK Police" T-shirt, with some holding the China national flag, beat people who were repairing the Lennon Wall.

In the afternoon, conflicts broke out inside Amoy Plaza in Kowloon Bay when members of the two camps attacked each other after the pro-Beijing citizens entered the mall to tear protest posters and chanted the national anthem inside. The police soon arrived to arrest both protesters and bystanders. In the nearby Lok Wah Estate, two people who identified themselves as off-duty officers subdued a young man who has just disembarked from a bus, one of which only showed their warrant card for about a second. The police, however, claimed that they were on-duty CID officers when inquired about the incident. Hang Lung Properties later affirmed that they did not call the police and that the police intervened without informing the mall management.

=== 15 September protests ===
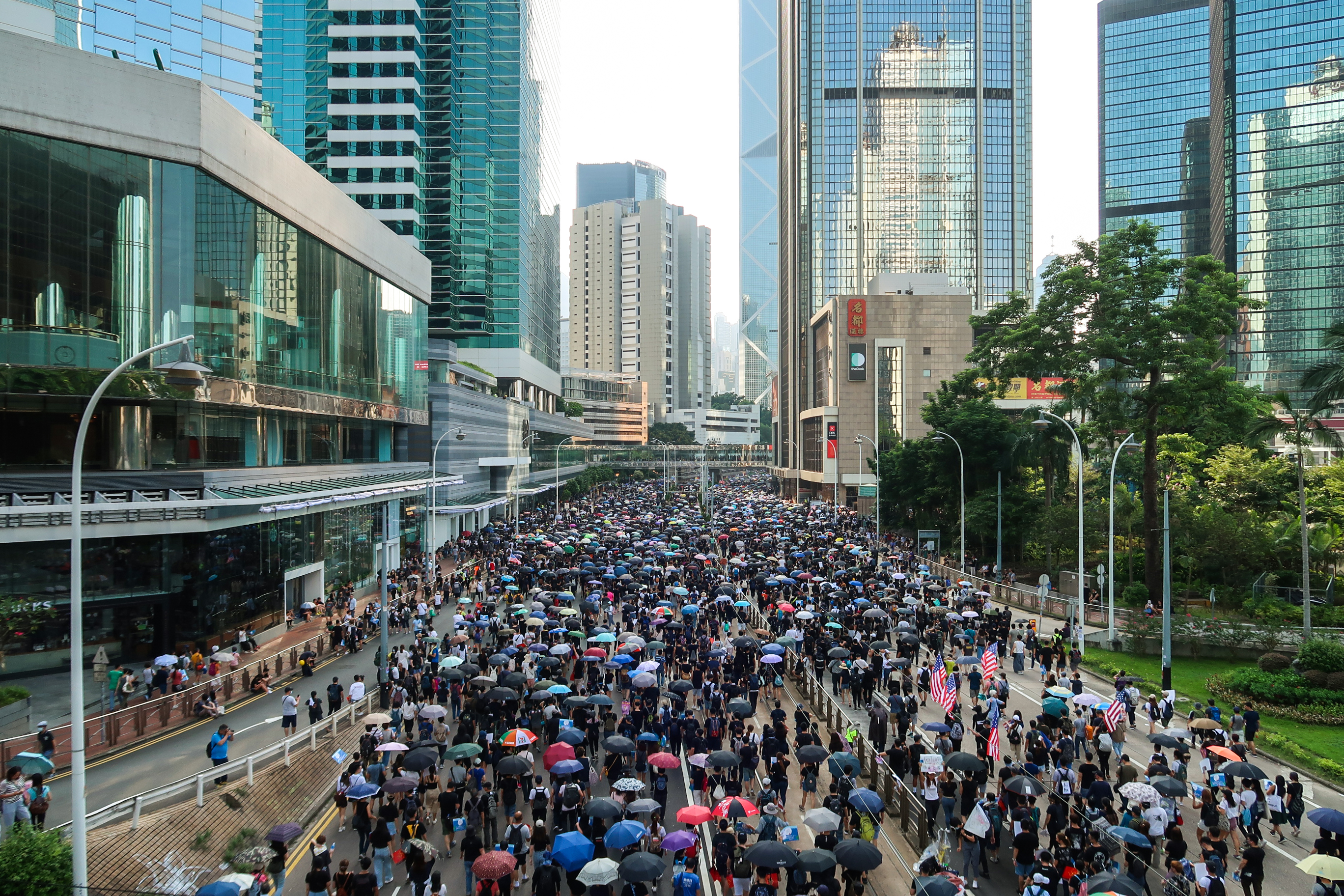
Thousands of protesters defied the police ban to march on Hong Kong Island on 15 September.

Outside the British Consulate in Admiralty, hundreds of protesters gathered. They sang God Save the Queen, demanded UK to recognise that China has violated the Sino-British Joint Declaration as well as more rights for BNO nationals. In the afternoon of 15 September, thousands of peaceful protesters marched in an action at Causeway Bay to Central despite police refusal to grant a permit. Protesters set up barricades and roadblocks along Harcourt Road and burnt a banner celebrating China's National Day, and hurled bricks and petrol bombs near the Central Government Complex. The police deployed water cannon trucks and tear gas to disperse them. Protesters soon retreated to Wan Chai, Causeway Bay and for the first time during the protests, they reached Happy Valley.

At night, protesters who retreated to Fortress Hill station were attacked by a group of Fujianese counterprotesters. The police arrived but failed to stop the fighting. A counterprotester also showed up with a knife and began pouring gasoline on the floor. The men fled into the Hong Kong First Youth Association, which was later searched by the police. The police, at night, dispersed the protesters by firing canisters of tear gas in the North Point neighbourhood. Two journalists were injured by the counterprotesters. One student journalist from HKBU was arrested by the police for possessing a butter knife, though the journalist defended himself by saying that it was used to cut mooncakes during the Mid-autumn festival. Legislator Ted Hui who was mediating the conflict was also arrested for "obstruction".

On Devil's Peak, a vertical protest banner was found for the third consecutive day in Hong Kong. This one was black with white font, demanding the government to "Drop Riot Charges" (「撤銷暴動控罪」).

=== 21 September protests ===
==== Reclaim Tuen Mun Park ====
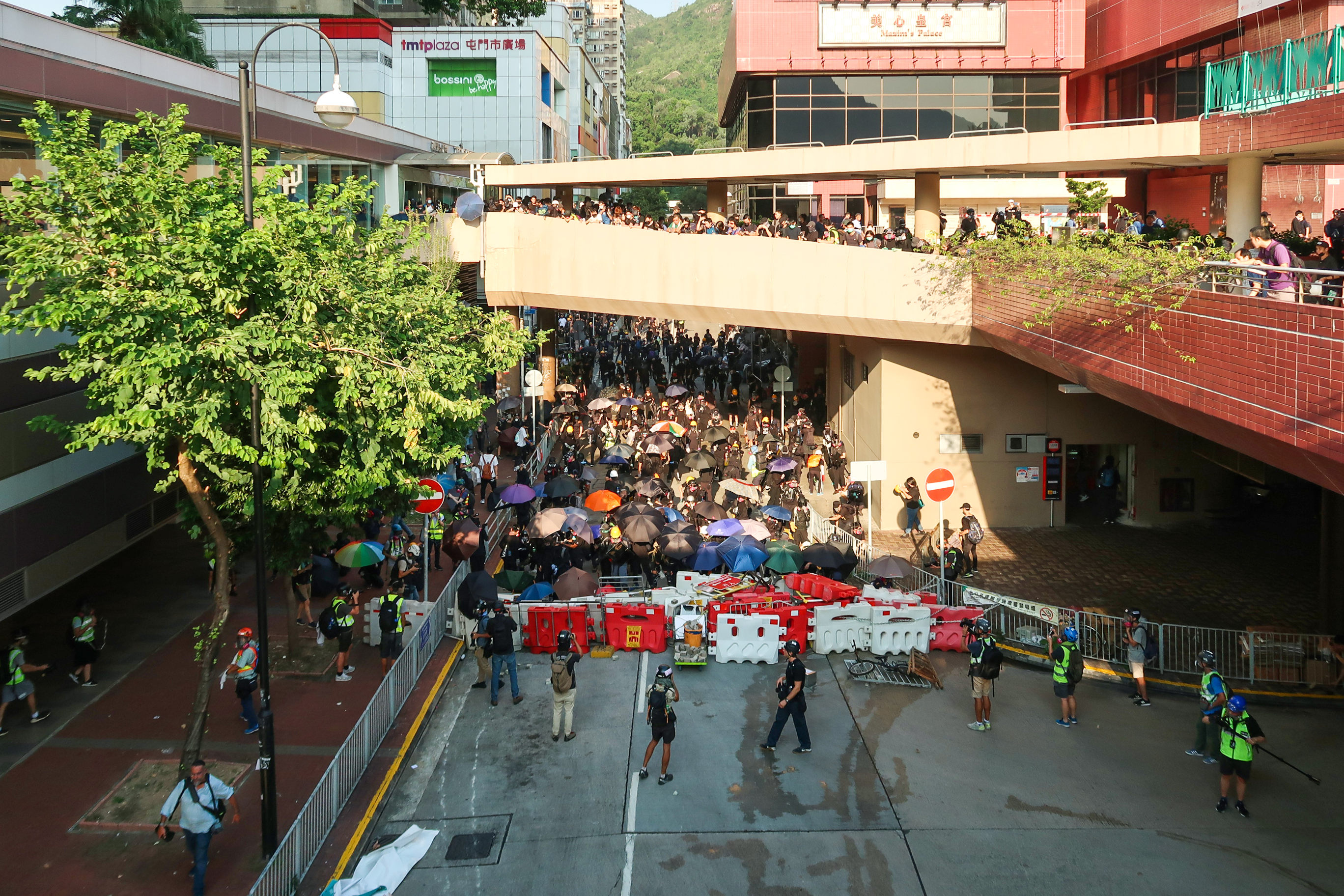
Protesters created roadblocks on Tuen Wui Street during the Reclaim Tuen Mun protest.

After a successful appeal, hundreds of protesters marched from San Wo Lane Playground to Tuen Mun government offices to protest against the "singing aunties". It was the second protest in Tuen Mun concerning the same issue. MTR closed the Tuen Mun station and Yuen Long station citing "security concerns". The police displayed warning signs several minutes after the march have begun. The protests soon escalated into conflicts between the protesters and the police. Protesters vandalised the Light Rail stations and burnt the Chinese national flags, while the police arrested both the protesters and some first-aiders. MTR then suspended the Light Rail service, prompting some protesters to retreat via the MacLehose Trail.

==== Yuen Long sit-in ====
A sin-in was planned inside Yuen Long station two months after the Yuen Long attacks. However, as MTR shut down the station earlier, protesters moved to the nearby Yoho Mall. It escalated into conflicts between the protesters and the police, with the police using tear gas while the protesters hurled objects such as petrol bombs. Police were accused of kicking an arrested but defenceless volunteer from the Protect Our Kids group after he was brought to an alley and surrounded by about 30 riot police officers. According to The Guardian, the "Protect Our Kids" volunteer had shouted at a police officer who had pepper-sprayed a 73-year-old member of the group. The volunteer was taken to hospital after being in the midst of the group of police. Police stated that the officers had kicked a "yellow object". His response created widespread backlash from Hong Kong citizens and the press for dehumanising the protesters.

In Tseung Kwan O, after two youths aged 13 and 16 years old respectively were arrested for possessing laser pens, residents briefly besieged the local police station. The police used tear gas to disperse the crowd.

In Beacon Hill, another "The Rioters Are None Other Than The Black Cops" (「黑警才是暴徒」) vertical protest banner was hung.

=== 22 September mall non-cooperation movement ===
Protesters gathered at various shopping malls in Hong Kong, including New Town Plaza, V Walk and Elements to chanted "Glory to Hong Kong" and various slogans. Inside New Town Plaza, protesters hung vertical protest banners display pro-democracy messages, decorated the mall with origami, and defaced a Chinese national flag before throwing it into Shing Mun River. A 13-year-old girl was arrested. Shops and firms including Huawei and Maxim's Caterers, which were considered to be pro-government and pro-Beijing were also targeted as protesters plastered stickers and posters on these shops' windows, prompting some of these shops to close early. Some radical protesters destroyed some mall equipment, while some created roadblocks outside the mall at Yuen Wo Road, which escalate into conflicts with the police who shot tear gas to disperse them.

After attending a carnival celebrating the National Day of China in Tsing Yi, Secretary for Constitutional and Mainland Affairs Patrick Nip was trapped by about 50 protesters, some of which threw objects at his vehicle. Riot police then arrived to disperse the crowd.

=== 23 September hill-top vertical protest banner on Beacon Hill ===
This yellow vertical protest banner showed the phrase "Disband the Police" (「解散警隊」).

=== 26 September town hall meeting ===
Lam met with members of the public at the Queen Elizabeth Stadium in Wan Chai. According to Hong Kong Free Press, Lam "faced more than two hours of grilling" by the majority of the attendees who raised concerns and criticisms about the Hong Kong Police Force and demands to achieve universal suffrage. 20,000 people applied to attend the dialogue session, though only 150 members were randomly selected. A large crowd also gathered outside the venue to chant slogans. Lam was trapped by the protesters waiting outside for 4 hours before she and other government officers managed to leave the building.

Reuters described the dialogue session as "not being the whitewash many predicted". However, critics were unsure what Lam can offer in these dialogue sessions since a Chinese envoy has previously affirmed that the HKSAR government would not make any more concession.

=== 27 September solidarity rally and more hill-top vertical protest banners ===
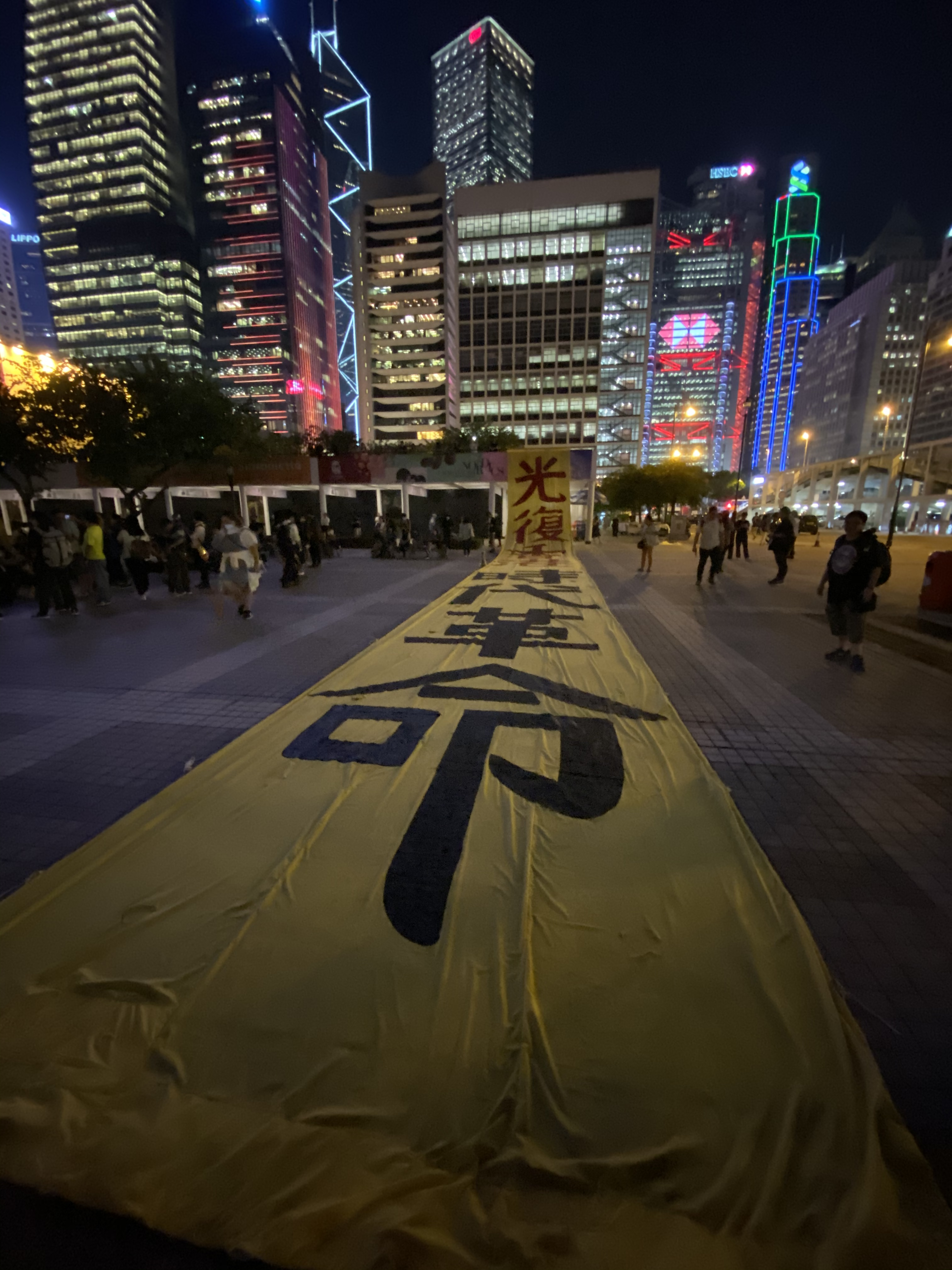
"Liberate Hong Kong, Revolution of our Times" vertical protest banner on 27 September 2019.

According to the organisers, 50,000 people attended a rally at Chater Garden, Central to stand in solidarity with the protesters who were detained in the San Uk Ling Holding Centre, where protesters were allegedly mistreated and sexually abused by the police. A massive, yellow vertical protest banner was hung from the roof and lie horizontally on the ground. The banner read "Liberate Hong Kong, revolution of our times" (「光復香港，時代革命」). Earlier in the day, four individuals climbed to Lion Rock and unfurled two vertical protest banners in blue fabric and white paint that read "God Kill Communist China; Annihilate The Entire Party" (「天滅中共 全黨死清光」). Not further from Lion Rock, another 40-meter vertical protest banner was hung on Beacon Hill that read "October 1: Celebrate His Mom" (「十一‧賀佢老母」), alluding to the anti-China sentiment Hong Kong citizens felt about the upcoming celebratory Chinese National Day.

=== 28 September CHRF rally ===
A rally was held by the Civil Human Rights Front to commemorate the fifth anniversary of the start of the Umbrella Revolution during the night of 28 September. Before the rally, an event named "Liberate Hong Kong, Lennon Wall Revolution", in which protesters plastered signs and stickers in Causeway Bay, Wan Chai and Central, was held. Protesters unfurled a vertical protest banner displaying the phrase "We are back", referencing the "We'll be back" sign erected during the end of the Umbrella Revolution. After the rally began, protesters began to occupy Harcourt Road, and sang "Glory to Hong Kong" and a modified version of "Chandelier" which condemns police brutality. Organisers claimed that 300,000 people attended the rally, while the police put the figure at 8,440.

Following the rally, the tension escalated. Protesters hurled bricks and Molotov cocktails towards the Government Headquarters, while the police deployed water cannon trucks and fired tear gas to disperse the protesters. Following the conflict, the police began a large-scale manhunt by searching bus passengers on Hong Kong Island and near the Cross-Harbour Tunnel in Hung Hom.

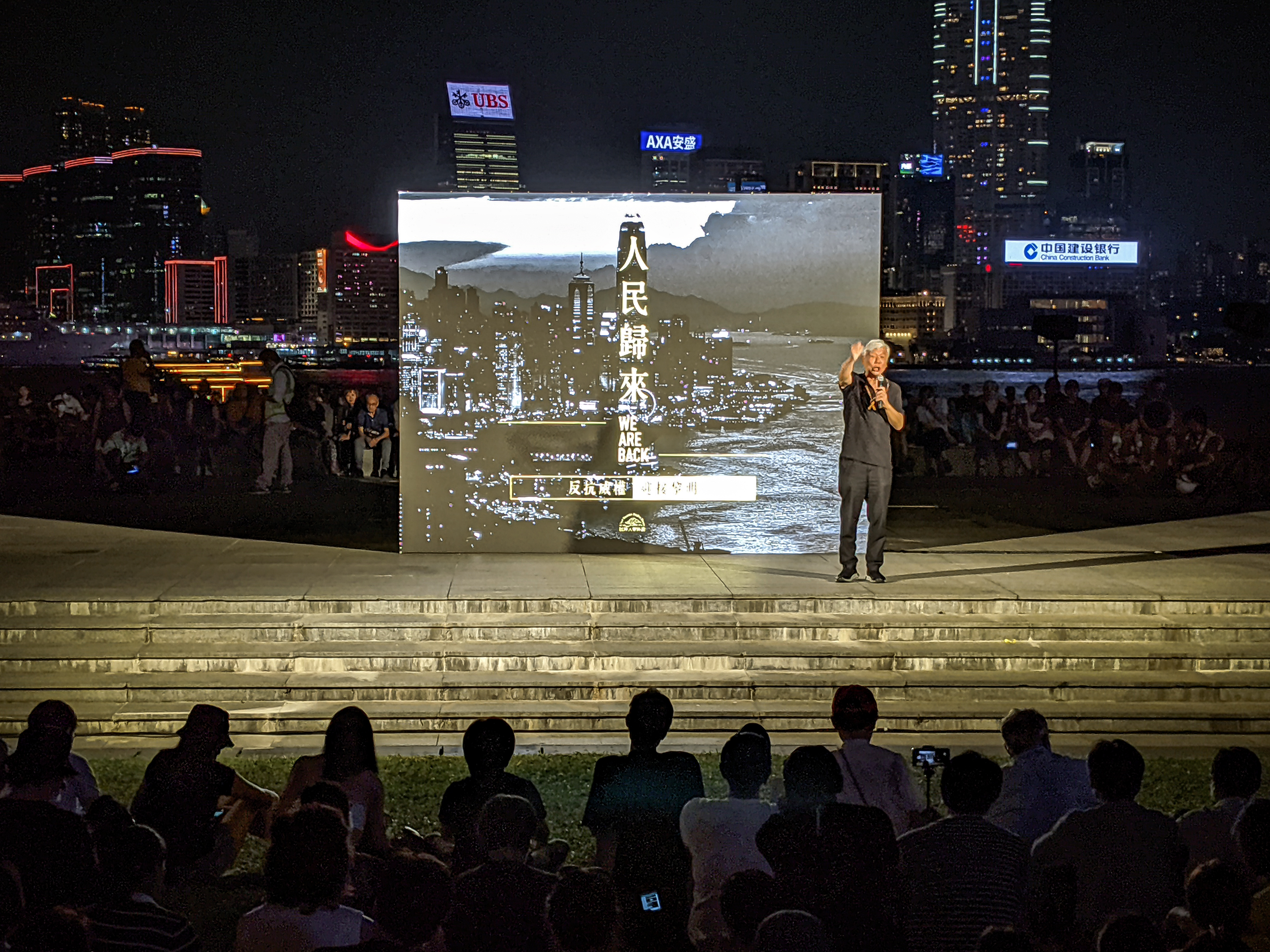
Chu Yiu-ming, one of the initiators of the Occupy Central with Love and Peace campaign, spoke during the rally.

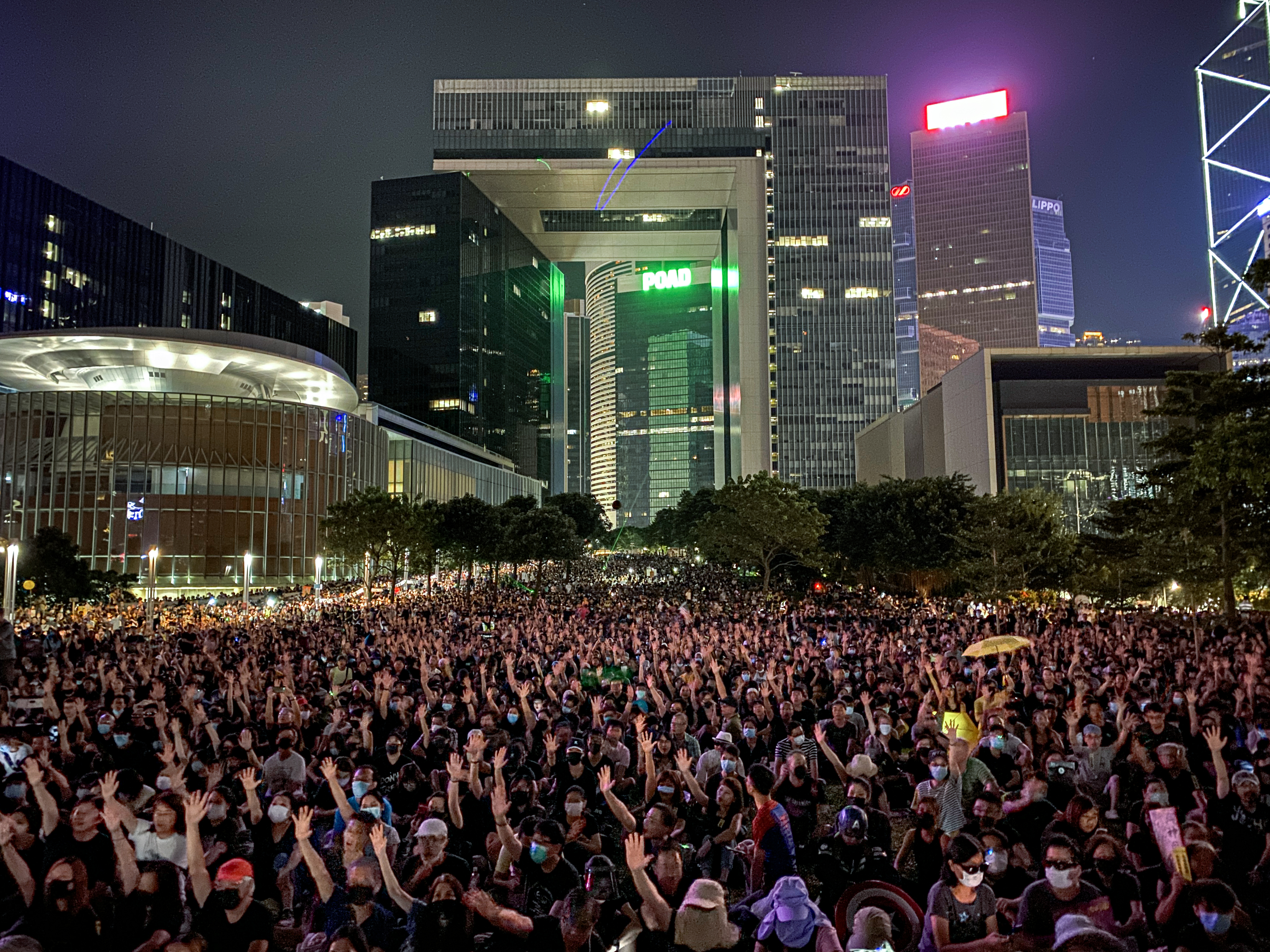
Protesters raised their hands with their palms as they chanted the slogan "Five Demands, Not One Less".

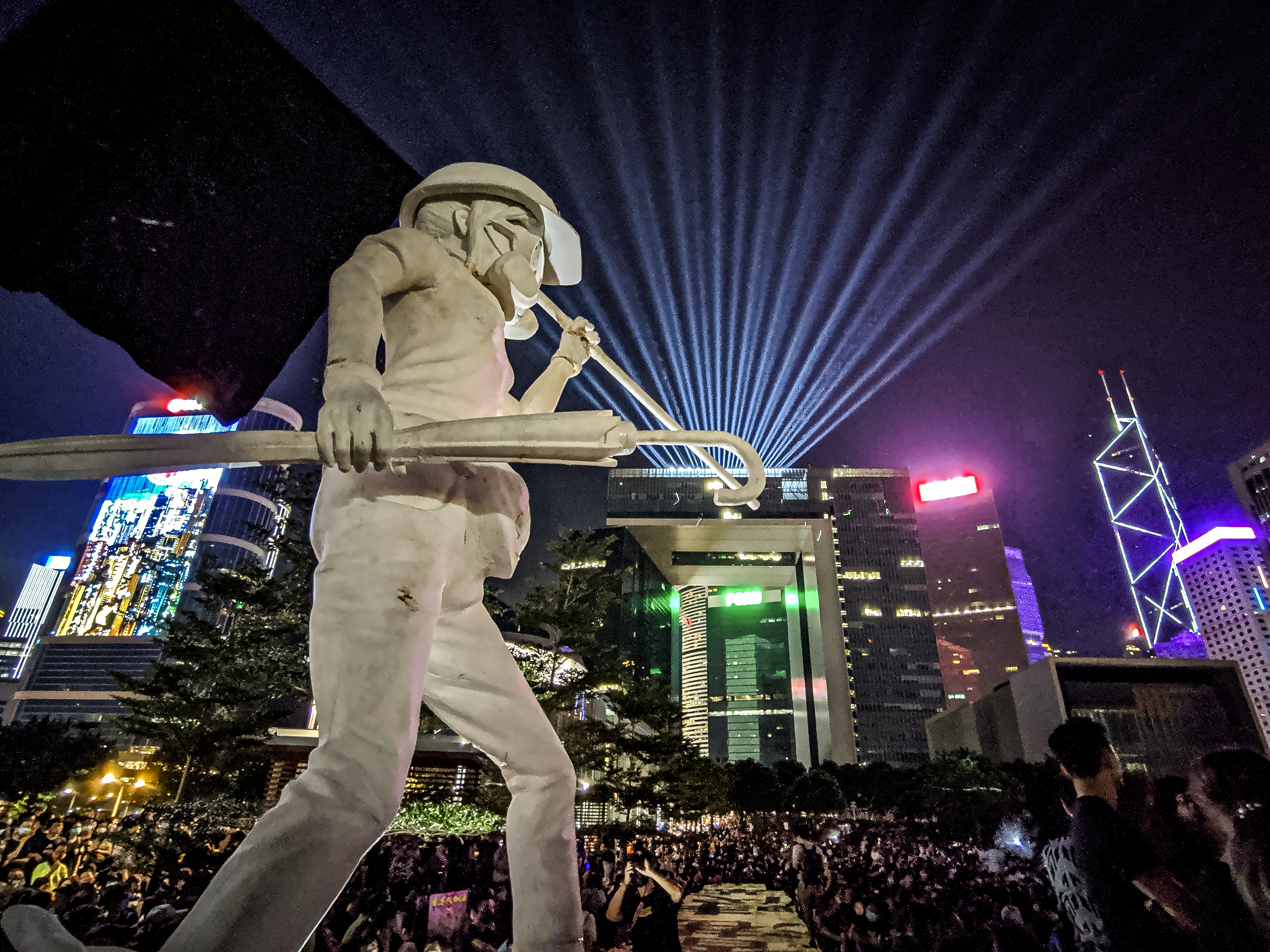
The statue Lady Liberty Hong Kong was displayed during the rally.

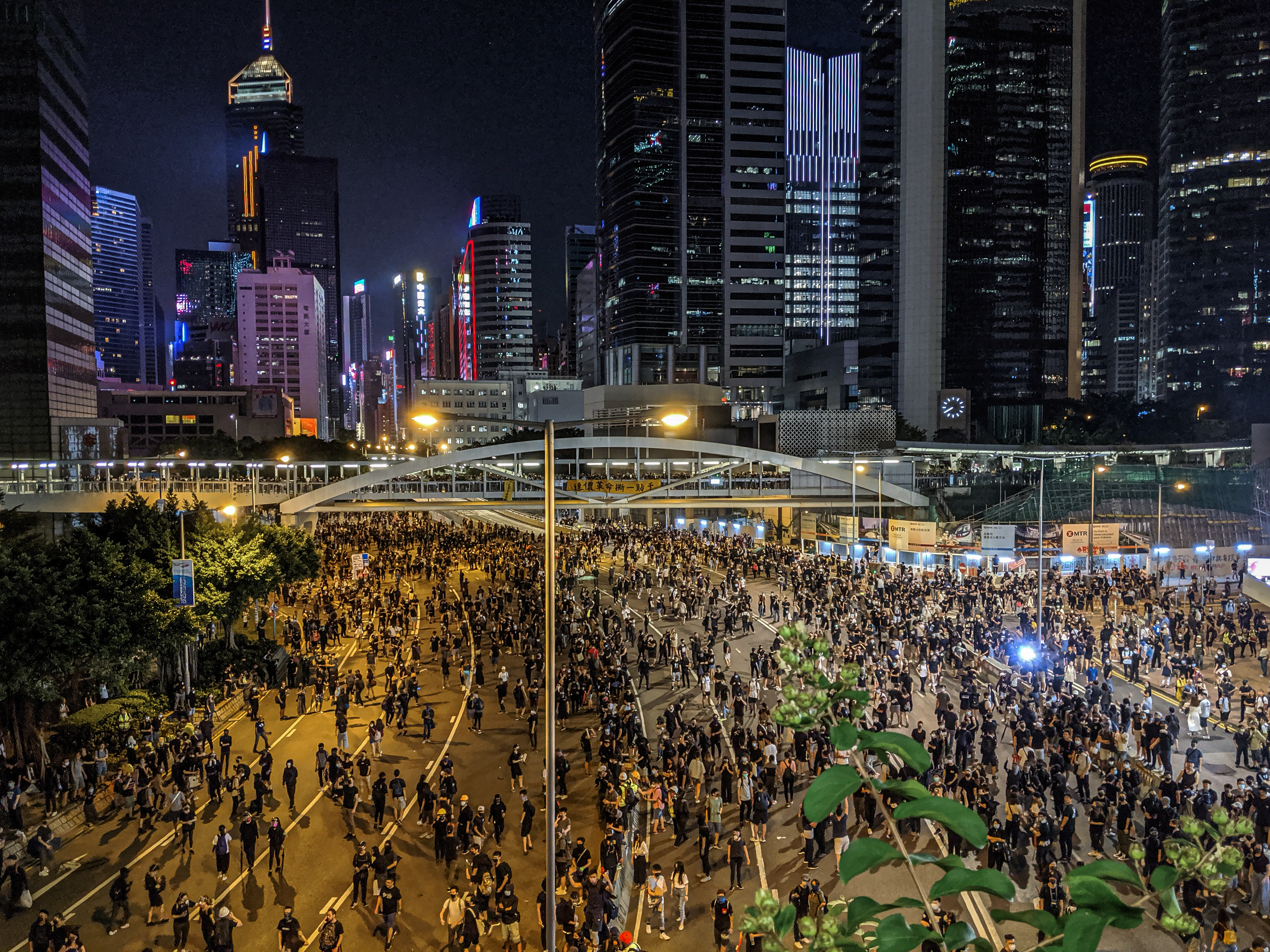
Similar to the Umbrella Revolution, protesters occupied Harcourt Road.

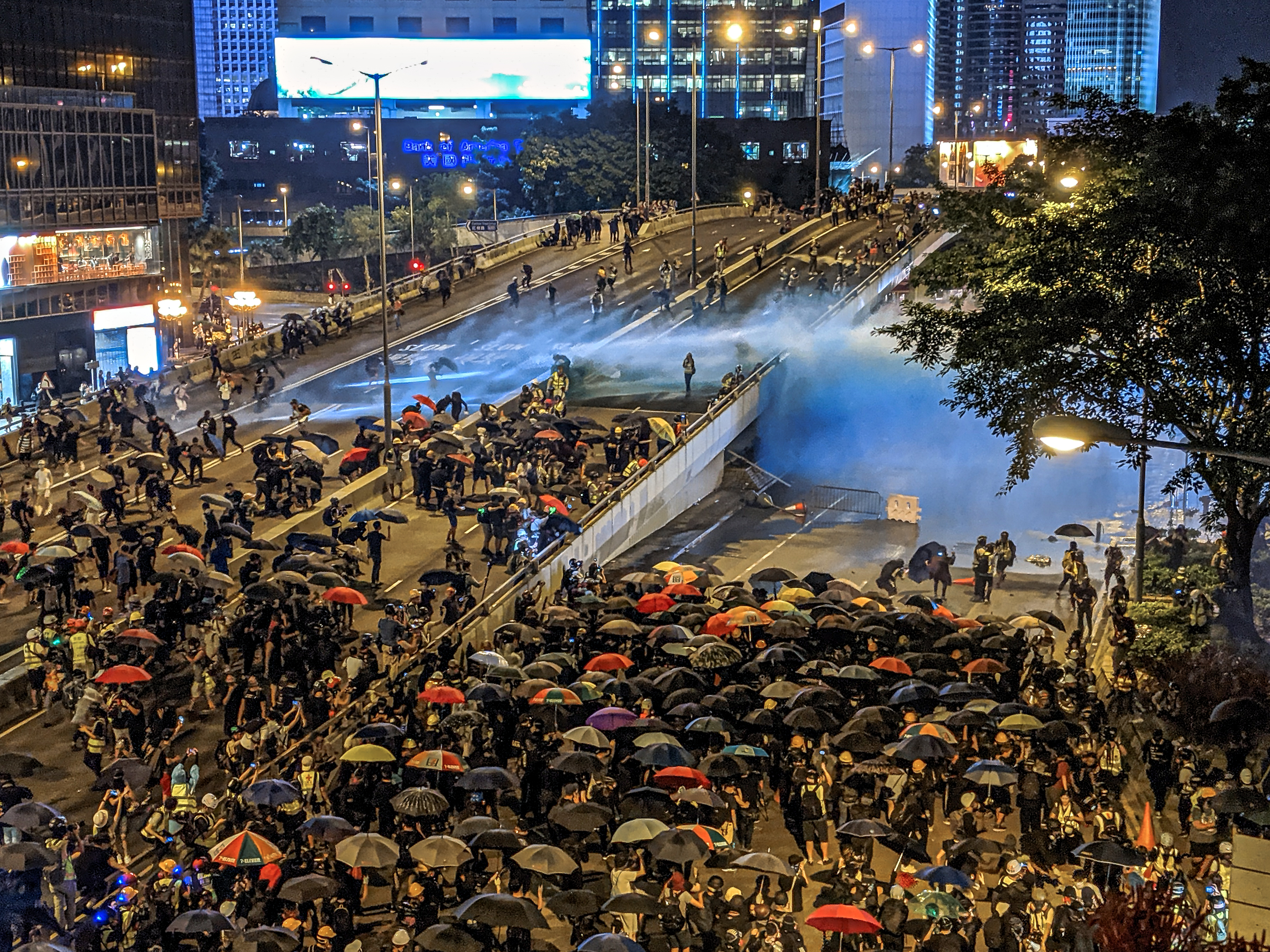
The police deployed water cannon trucks to disperse the protesters.

=== 29 September Anti-CCP protests ===
An unauthorized protest, part of global "anti-totalitarism" rallies to denounce "Chinese tyranny" ahead of the 70th anniversary of the People's Republic of China on 1 October, was scheduled to start at 3:00 p.m. in Causeway Bay shopping district and lead to Admiralty. Riot police began guarding the area hours before. They fired several rounds of tear gas at crowds, many of whom fled in panic, and subdued several protesters before the rally was to start, but were unable to stop the regrouping marchers, who numbered in the thousands. Protesters held placards that displayed the phrase "Say No to Chinazi" and chanted slogans such as "Stand with Hong Kong, fight for freedom" and tore down signs which congratulated the Chinese Communist Party to the anniversary. The march escalated into intense conflicts. The police used rubber bullets and tear gas to disperse the protesters while some of the protesters threw bricks and petrol bombs. More than 100 people were arrested by the police. The police was accused of using an arrestee as a human shield. Indonesian journalist Veby Mega Indah also accused the police of permanently blinding her right eye after it was ruptured by a rubber bullet.

Solidarity protests were held in over 40 cities around the world. Hong Kong singer and democracy activist Denise Ho was attacked with red paint during a protest in Taipei, with the assailant later identified as a member of the Chinese Unification Promotion Party.

A total of 96 people were charged over the clash at Admiralty. They were split into several court cases.

In April 2022 three protesters were found guilty of rioting outside the Central Government Offices. Two of them received sentences of four and a half years each in May, and the third, whose case had been delayed by a COVID-19 infection, a sentence of five years in June 2022. In his ruling in the latter case, the judge made reference to the date of the protest shortly before the China National Day public holiday, which he called "sensitive", and said that the defendant had to "pay a grave price, becoming cannon fodder in the battlefield". In August 2022, a further eleven protesters were found guilty of having rioted outside the Central Government Offices. Five protesters were sentenced for rioting on to jail terms of up to four years and seven months, and two minor defendants were sent to a training centre, in November 2021. Four days later that month, a further protester in the same court case was sentenced for rioting to three years and five months. On 10 January, four protesters were found guilty of rioting; five others in the same case had earlier pleaded guilty. On 13 January, the nine defendants were sentenced to between 28 and 50 months in prison. A 19-year-old male, who had been 16 at the time of the protest, was sentenced to a training centre for rioting on 3 March 2023; the judge said that while the defendant had "clearly come prepared" to the protest, wearing a gas mask to block tear gas, he had been swayed by the atmosphere, it had been "easy [for him] to be affected by the social atmosphere at that time and other people". On 5 October 2023, prison terms for rioting, of between 28 and 51 months, were imposed on 23 protesters at a district court.

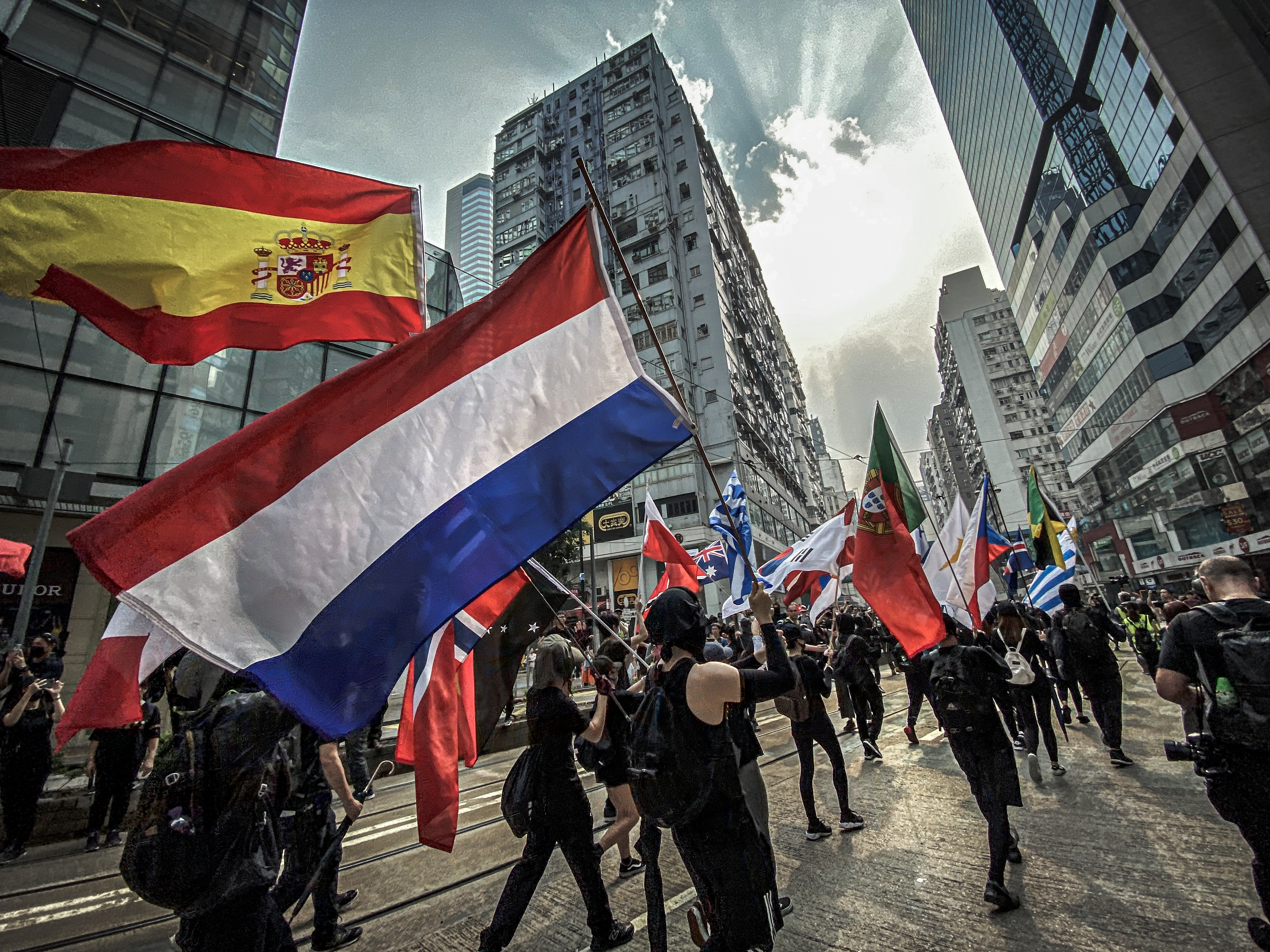
Protesters waved the flags of various countries during the protest.

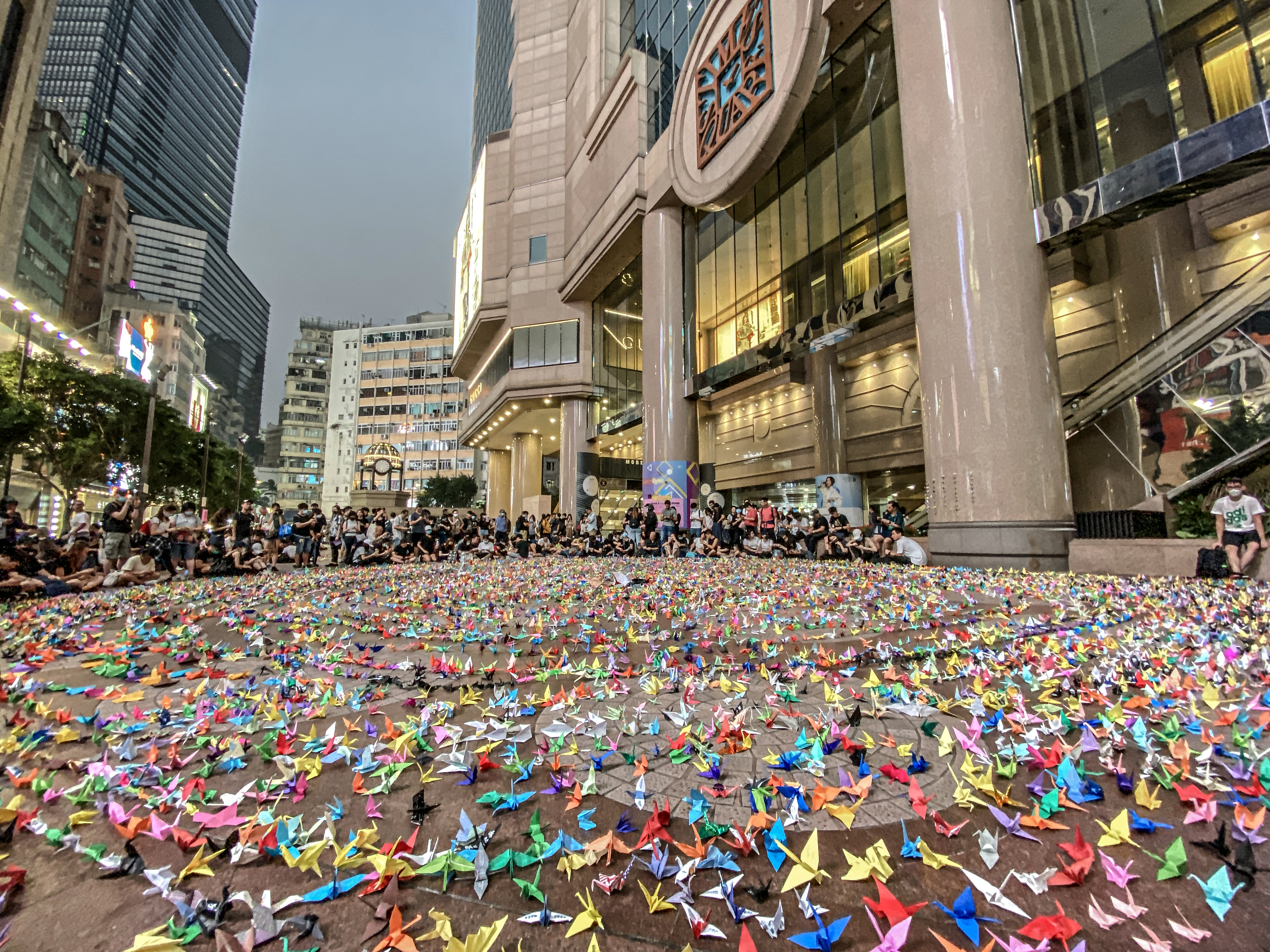
Near Time Square, thousands of origami paper cranes named "freenix" were folded and displayed by peaceful protesters.

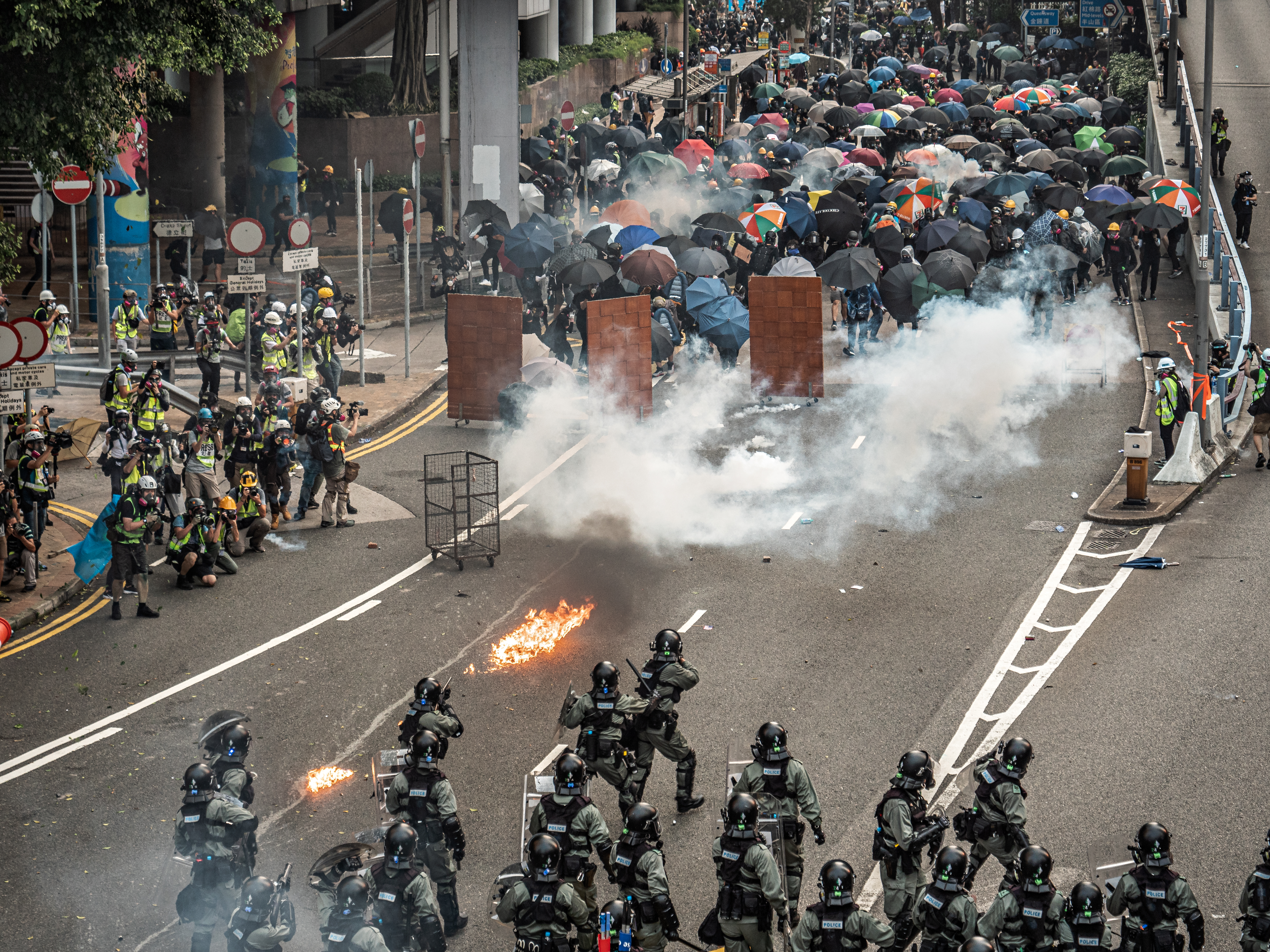
The police used tear gas to disperse the protesters.

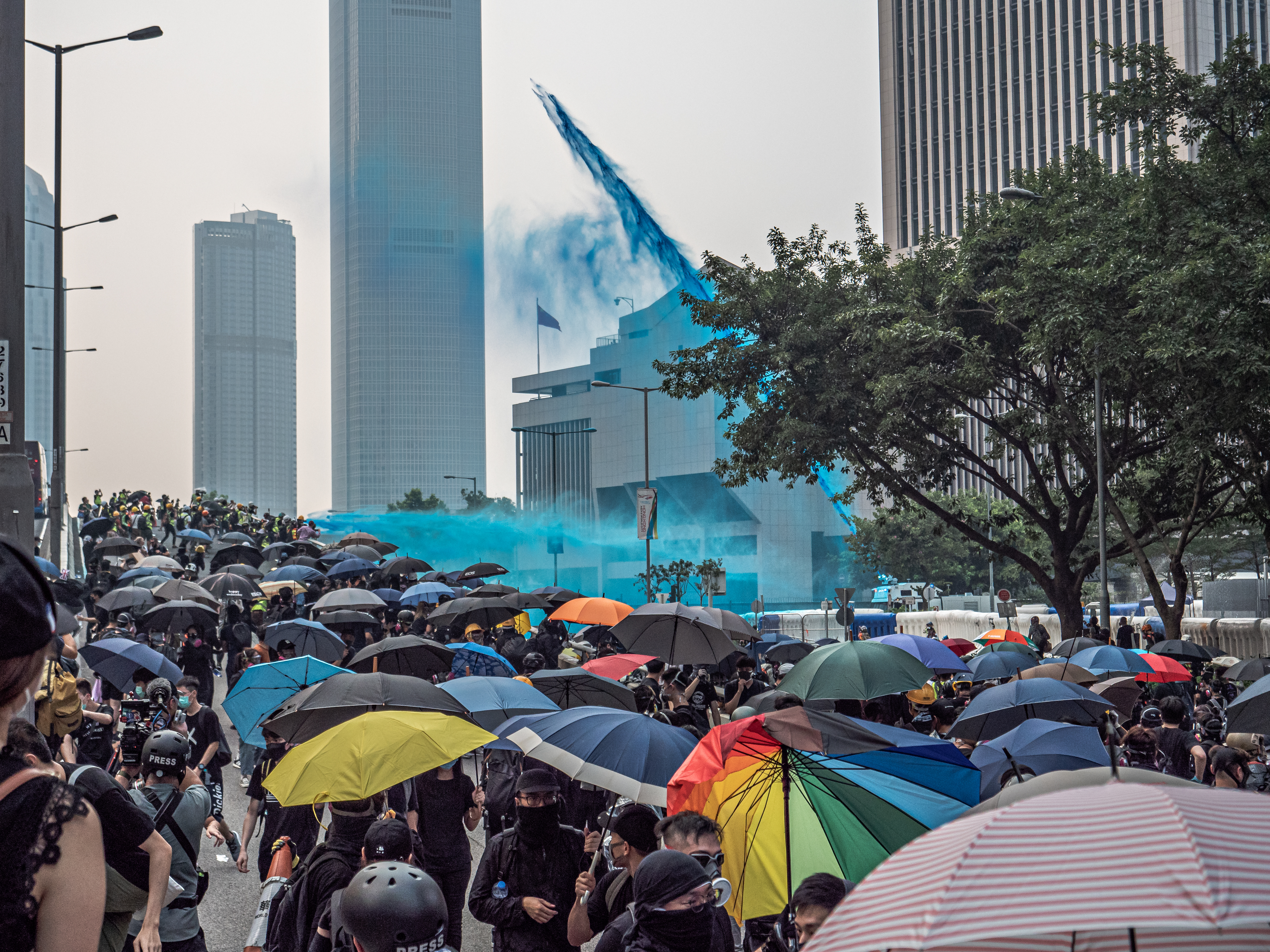
Water cannon trucks were deployed near the Central Government Headquarters.

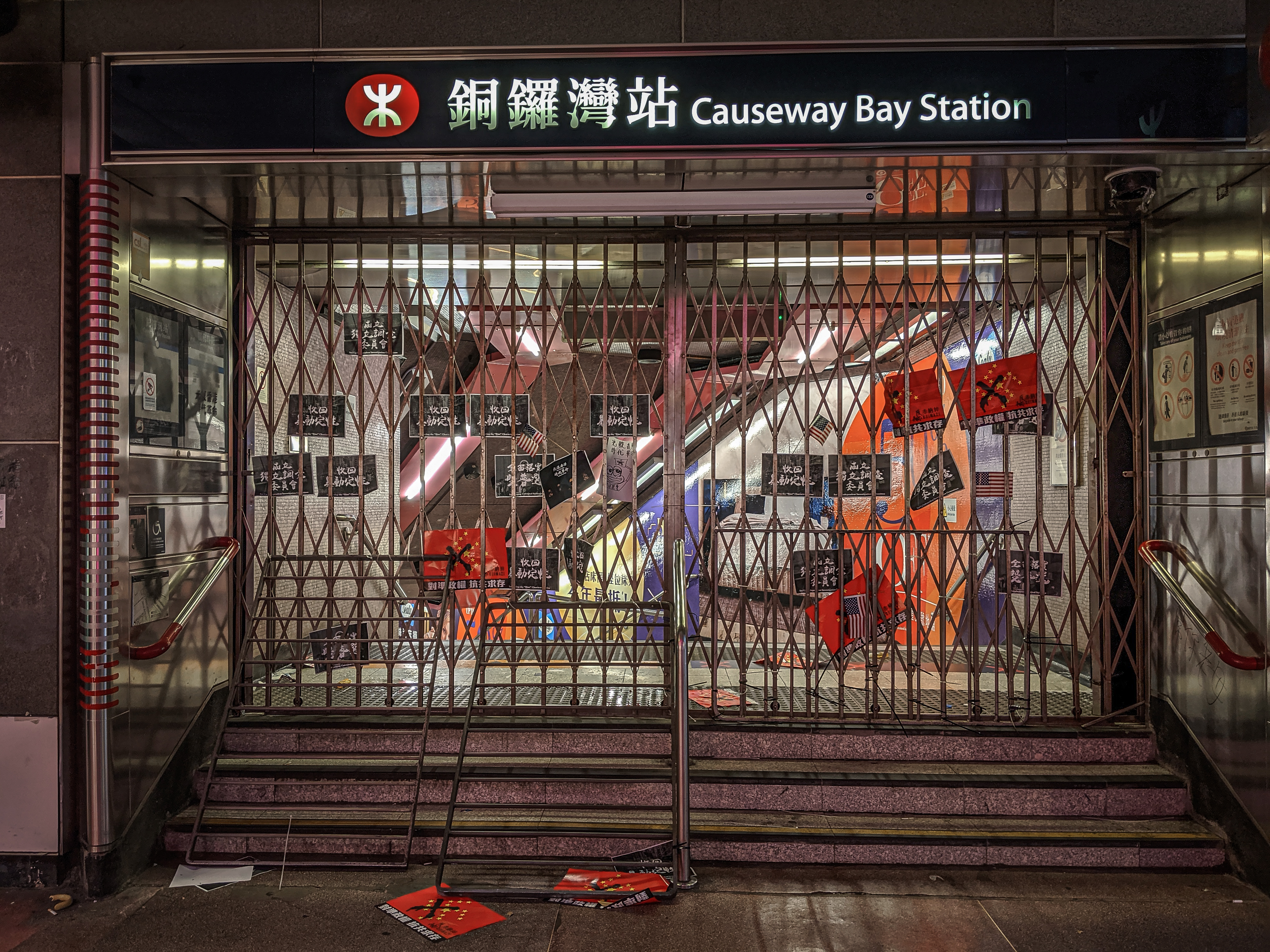
Protesters plastered the gate of Causeway Bay station with anti-CCP placards.

=== 30 September Vertical protest banner unfurled on Kowloon Hill ===
The day before China's National Day celebration Hong Kong citizens saw an "End One Party Rule" (「結束一黨專政」) hill-top vertical protest banner on Kowloon Hill.
