= Carmel Pak U Secondary School =

School in Hong Kong

Coordinates: 22.4546°N 114.1713°E

Carmel Pak U Secondary School Chinese: 迦密柏雨中學
- Logo of Carmel Pak U Secondary School
- Tai Yuen Estate, Tai Po, New Territories; Hong Kong

Information
- Established: 1979
- School district: Tai Po
- Principal: Wong Chun
- Affiliation: Fundamentalist Christianity
- Founding body: Evangelism School Development Incorporation Ltd.
- Website: Carmel Pak U Secondary School

Carmel Pak U Secondary School
- Traditional Chinese: 迦密柏雨中學
- Simplified Chinese: 迦密柏雨中学
Transcriptions
Standard Mandarin
- Hanyu Pinyin: Jiāmì Bǎi Yǔ Zhōngxué
Yue: Cantonese
- Jyutping: gaa1 mat6 paak3 jyu5 zung1 hok6

Carmel Pak U Secondary School (Chinese: 迦密柏雨中學; Jyutping: gaa1 mat6 paak3 jyu5 zung1 hok6; Abbreviated as CPU) is a Protestant fundamentalist co-educational secondary school in Tai Po, Hong Kong established in 1979. The current principal is Wong Wai-keung.

== School Features ==
=== School management ===
Four committees are founded based on the four areas of growth of Jesus Christ stated in Luke 2:52, "and Jesus increased in wisdom and stature, and in favour with God and man." These four committees, Academic Affairs Committee, Discipline and Moral Education Committee, Religious Activities Committee, and Extra-Curricular Activities Committee, are formed to take care of the development of students in these four areas. Additionally, a committee named Guidance and Award Scheme Committee is formed to guide the students to have a balanced growth in those four areas and to acknowledge their attainments through the Award Scheme.

=== Facilities ===
There are 8 devices and 1 screen in every room, including the LCD projector, visualizer, overhead projector, DVD player, videocassette recorder, tape recorder, wireless PA system, air-conditioner and the screen. Computers, clocker and thermometers are also installed in each room in recent years. In addition, cable/wireless broadband network is connected and more than 345 computers are installed throughout the campus. In 2007–2008, free telephone-dialing services are set in each floor for the convenience of students to contact their relatives. In 2013–14, TV screens are added to the entrance of the school. Also, the school bought about 20 Tablets.

== Class structures and admission ==
Students who admitted to the school are all from Band 1 category. In HKCEE 2007, 98.1% of students in the school got five passes (Grade E/Level 2) or above; and 99.5%, 100%, and 97.6% passed in Chinese, English, and Mathematics, respectively. Moreover, 17.5% of students in the school had scored Level 5* in Chinese, which is the highest percentage among Hong Kong secondary schools in HKCEE 2007. Over the years, many have even scored 7 or 8 distinctions in the HKCEE and 4 or 5 distinctions in HKALE. The school is among the few schools that have three F.6 classes. All of the F.6 places are filled up by the own graduates of the school. Last year, 95.5% of our F.7 graduates were admitted to universities through JUPAS, while 3 F.6 students were admitted through Early Admission Scheme.

=== Junior Form (F.1–F.3) ===
==== Students places ====
- F.1 admission places: 144
- 4 class in each form
- about 36 students at 1 class

==== Subjects offered ====
- Biblical Knowledge
- Chinese Language
- English Language
- Mathematics
- Integrated Science
- Computer Literacy
- Putonghua
- Chinese History
- Economics & Public Affairs
- Geography
- History
- Design & Technology
- Home Economics
- Visual Arts
- Music
- Physical Education

=== Senior Form (F.4-F.6) ===
==== Subject offered (Core) ====
- Chinese Language
- English Language
- Mathematics (with/without elective module 2)
- Liberal Studies

==== Subject offered (Elective) ====
- Chinese Literature
- Chinese History
- Economics
- Geography
- History
- Biology
- Chemistry
- Physics
- Combined Science
- Information & Communication Technology
- Business, Accounting and Financial Studies

=== Academic Affairs Committee ===
==== Society ====
- Chinese Society
- English Society
- Mathematics Society
- Science Society
- Computer Society
- History Society
- Social Science Society
- Liberal Studies Society

==== School Team ====
- Mathematics Team (Junior/Senior)
- Chinese Debating Team (Junior/Senior)
- English Debating Team
- General QA Team
- Putonghua Team

==== Students Services Team ====
- Student Librarians
- Book-packing Group
- Environmental Ambassador

==== Interest Group ====
- Putonghua Interest Group (For Senior Form Students)
- Electronic Models Class
- Astronomy Interest Group

=== Discipline and Moral Education Committee ===
==== Voluntary Services ====
- Community Youth Club (CYC)

==== Students Services Team ====
- Prefect

=== Religious Activities Committee ===
==== Assembly ====
- Gospel Fortnight (Traditional Chinese: 福音雙週)
- Christian Fellowship

==== Team ====
- Gospel Team

=== Extra-Curricular Activities Committee ===
==== Music ====
===== Choir =====
The Choirs in Carmel Pak U Secondary School won many prizes during the music festival these years.

- Junior Girls Choir
- Junior Mixed Choir
- Senior Boys Choir
- Senior Girls Choir
- Senior Mixed Choir

===== Handbell Choir =====
- Junior Handbell Choir
- Senior Handbell Choir

== Famous alumni ==
- Dr. Yuen Man Fung (The 35th Ten Outstanding Young Person Selection Awardee, JCIHK)
- Elkie Chong (Chong Ting Yan), former TVB child actress and member of Korean girl group CLC
- Serrini (Leung Ka Yun), an independent singer in Hong Kong

== See also ==
- Education in Hong Kong
- List of secondary schools in Hong Kong
