= Timeline of the 2019–2020 Hong Kong protests (July 2020) =

July events of the 2019–2020 pro-democracy demonstrations in Hong Kong

Timeline of the 2019–2020 Hong Kong protests
2019			March–June				July	August	September	October	November	December
2020	January	February	March	April	May	June	July	August	September	October	November	December
2021	January	February	March	April	May	June	July	August	September–November			December

The month of July 2020 in the 2019–2020 Hong Kong protests began with a turning point in the evolution of the protests, brought about by the Hong Kong national security law. The law, which had been passed by the Standing Committee of the National People's Congress of China on 30 June and come into effect on the same day, was widely seen as having the purpose of curbing opposition, in a broad sense, against the Chinese Communist Party in the city. The law had direct relevance to the protests, as it prescribes harsh penalties for the tactics that protesters had commonly used. Nevertheless, sizeable protests erupted throughout the city on occasion of the 1 July protests the next day, resulting in about 370 arrests, including at least ten on charges under the new law. The Hong Kong government, faced with the task of implementing a law that had been drafted and promulgated without substantial involvement by its own officials, was seen widely, including in the academic and media sectors, as being unable to draw a clear demarcation line between which acts would constitute punishable offences under the law, and which would not. The vagueness of the law, while refused by the city's police chief, was seen by pro-democrats and observers as a deliberate device to amplify its deterrence effect.

While the law immediately created a chilling effect, smaller protests continued into the month. During these, protesters sometimes used inventive means to adapt, such as holding up blank sheets of paper, or singing the protest anthem Glory to Hong Kong with numbers instead of lyrics. The month ended with major suppression activities by the local government, including the arrest of four student activists and a ban on twelve pan-democratic candidates for the legislative council election in September. In justifying the disqualifications, the Hong Kong government stated that the candidates had intended to breach the national security law once elected. On 31 July, the Hong Kong government announced that the election would be deferred by a year due to the worsening of the COVID-19 crisis.

Already before the disqualifications of opposition candidates, there were calls by pro-democrats in Hong Kong and their sympathizers abroad for increasing international pressure on China to change its politics regarding Hong Kong. Furthermore, there were calls on Western countries to provide safe havens for protesters through temporary residence and to create pathways for immigration. Several Western countries took steps to respond to the latter requests, as the United Kingdom had already done earlier, with these steps being sharply criticized by mainland Chinese officials. In relation to non-governmental activism, it was noted internationally that the security law expressly states (in its Article 38) that it also applies to non-Hong Kong permanent residents located outside of Hong Kong.

== Events ==
=== 1 July ===
==== National Security Law comes into effect ====
The Hong Kong national security law came into effect 23:00 on 30 June, which criminalized advocating "secession", "subversion", "terrorism", and "collusion" of the Chinese government. Police continued to use the coronavirus law, which aimed at discouraging public assembly, to ban the annual July 1 march.

==== Marches against National Security Law ====
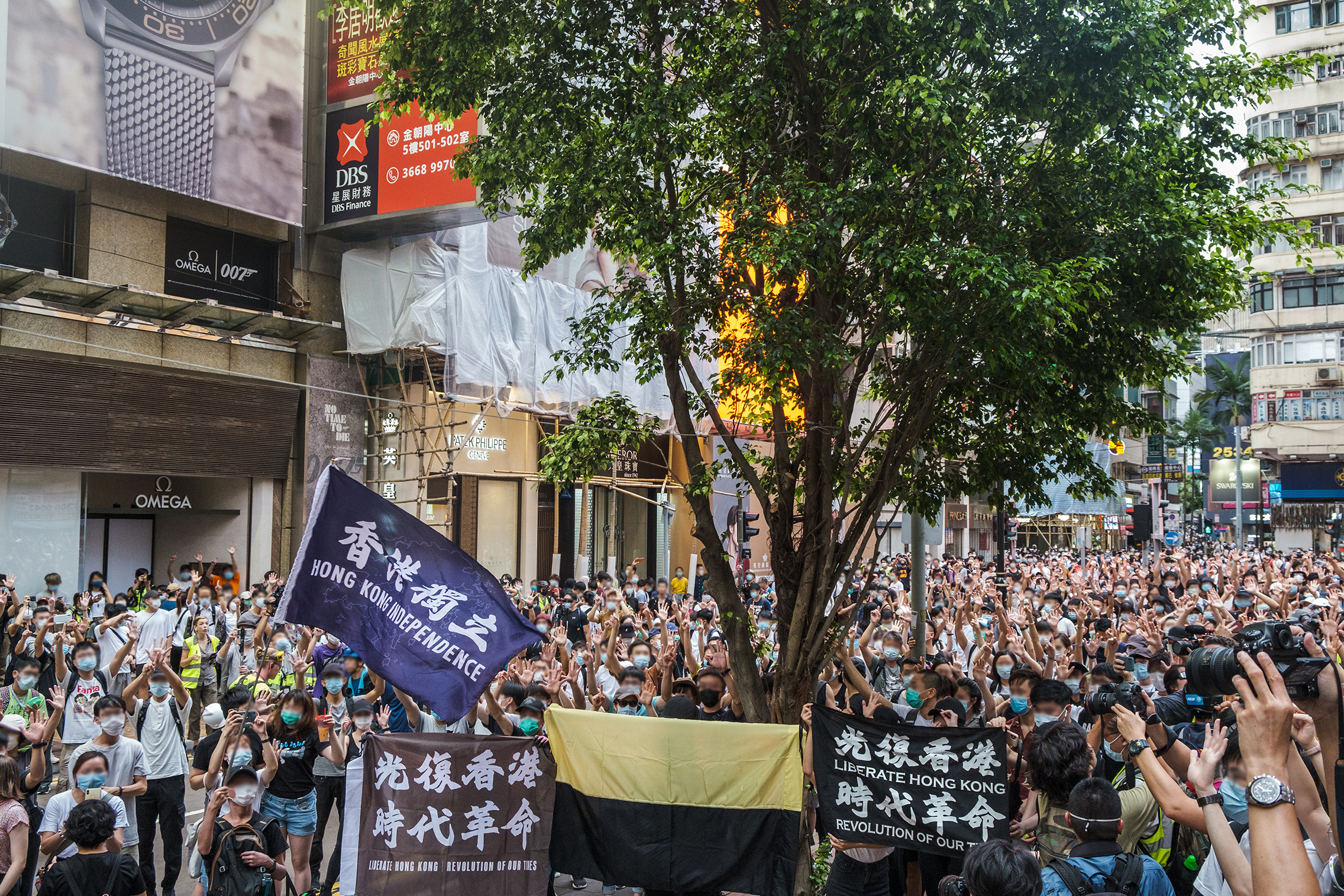
Many citizens on Russell Street in Causeway Bay held high the Five Demands gesture sign and displayed the flag of Liberate Hong Kong, which was alleged to have the meaning of Hong Kong independence

Despite police ban, tens of thousands of protesters showed up, alongside heavy police presence, to Causeway Bay, Wan Chai, Tin Hau and lingered in the area for almost six hours to voice their objection against the newly implemented national security law. Police used a water cannon to disperse protesters.

Police made more than 370 arrests, of which it said 10 were for offences related to the new national security law. Authorities said that seven police officers were injured, with one having been stabbed in the arm while taking arrest action. Police condemned the stabbing and said that no by-standers had come forward to help the stabbed officer. In the evening, a person suspected of having perpetrated the stabbing was escorted off a flight bound for London at Chek Lap Kok Airport by airport police.

An anonymous woman who held up a blank sheet of paper near a police cordon gained wider attention. This method of protest, not new in itself, was taken up by other protesters in the following days to avoid the use of the slogan Liberate Hong Kong, revolution of our times which the government had said was illegal, and in 2022 during protests triggered by COVID-19 restrictions in mainland China, which led the latter to be colloquially referenced as White Paper Protests.

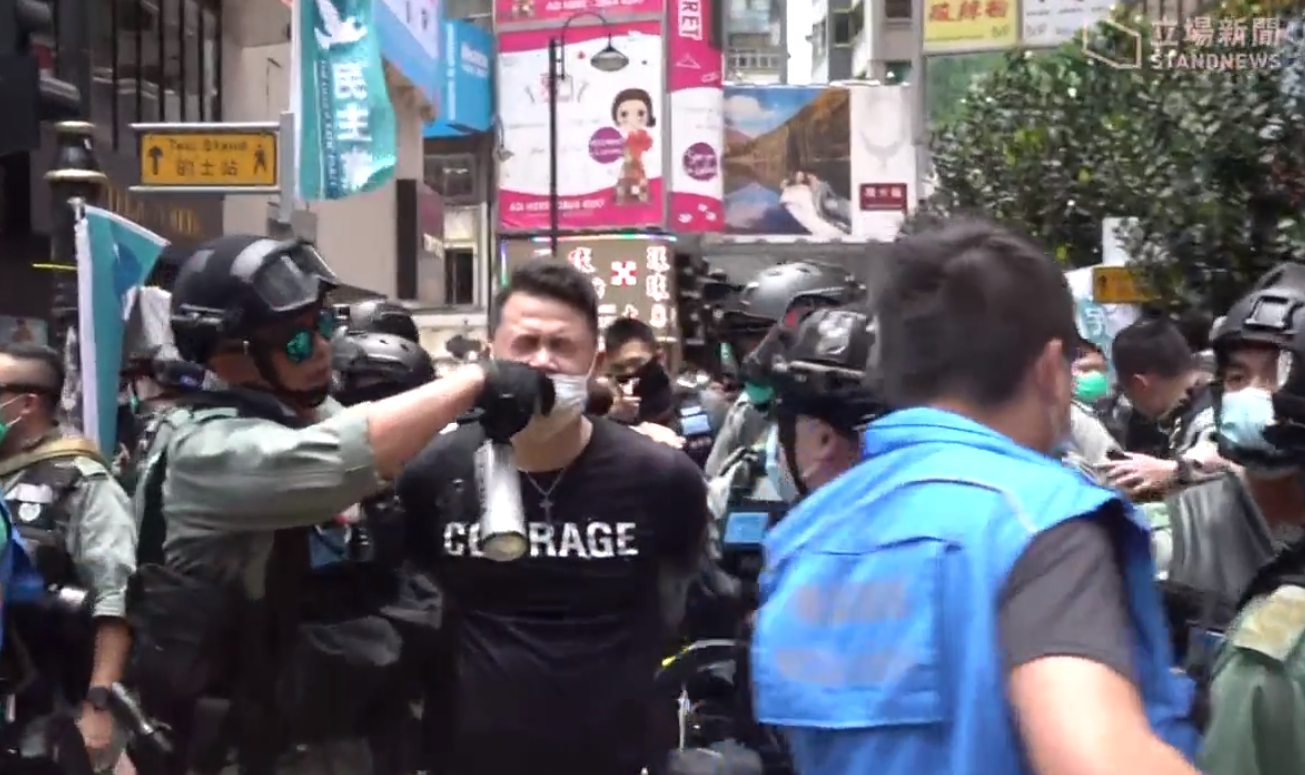
At 1 pm, Democratic Party member Andrew Wan was pressed on the ground by police officers, and then he was arrested by a rope.

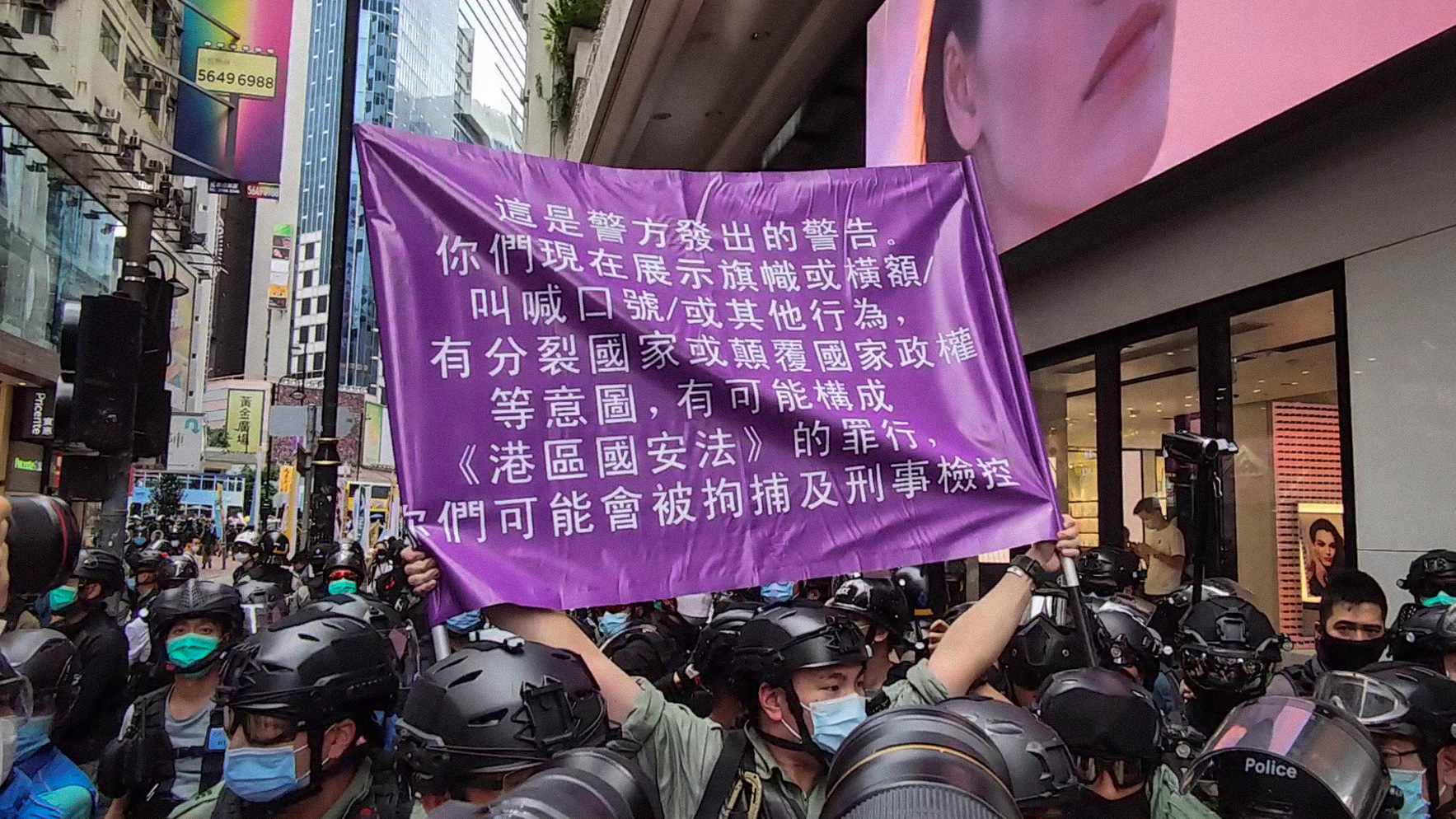
At noon, the police were advancing along Great George Street and East Point Road, and for the first time raised a purple warning flag.

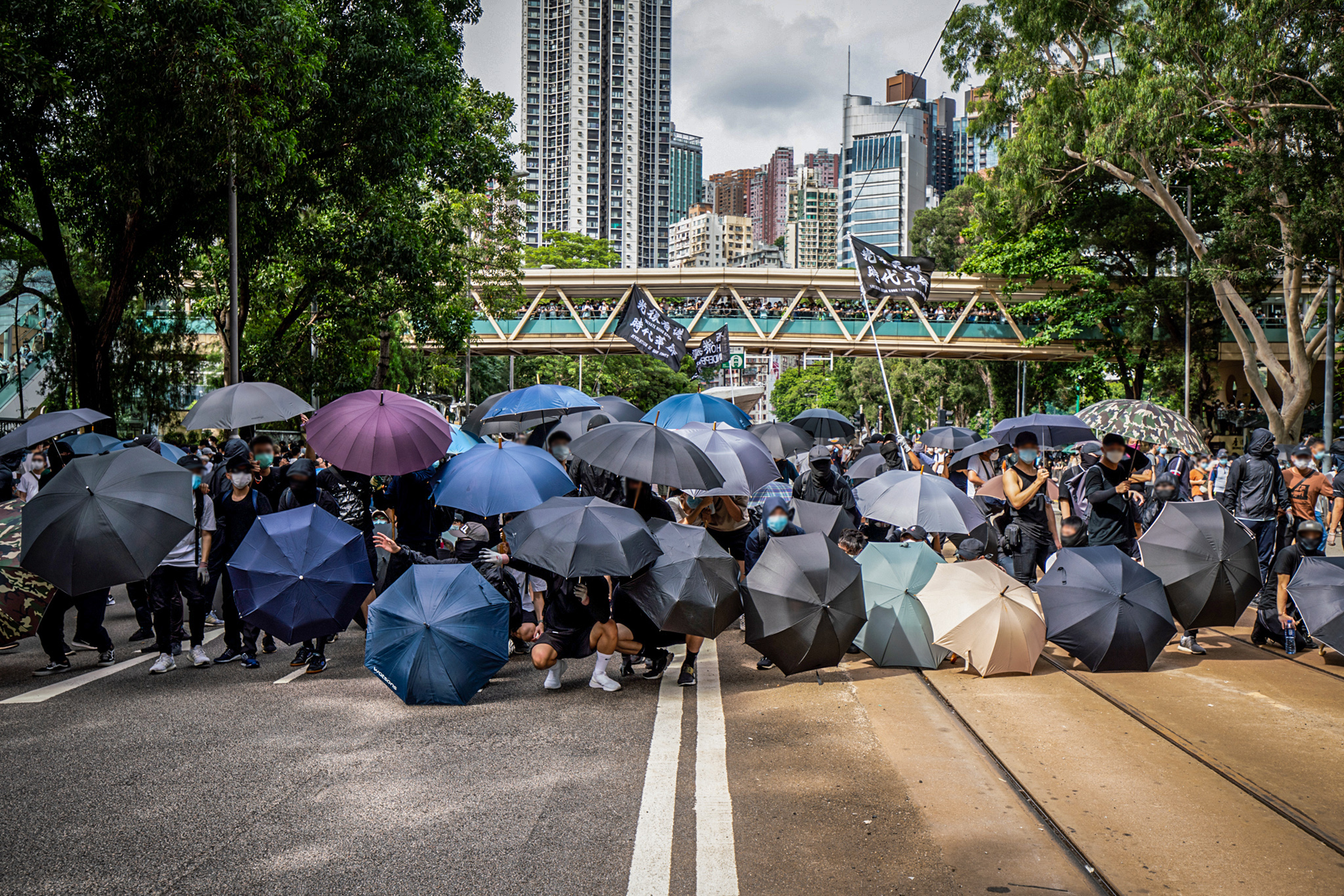
On Causeway Road between Hong Kong Central Library and Victoria Park, demonstrators formed an umbrella array.

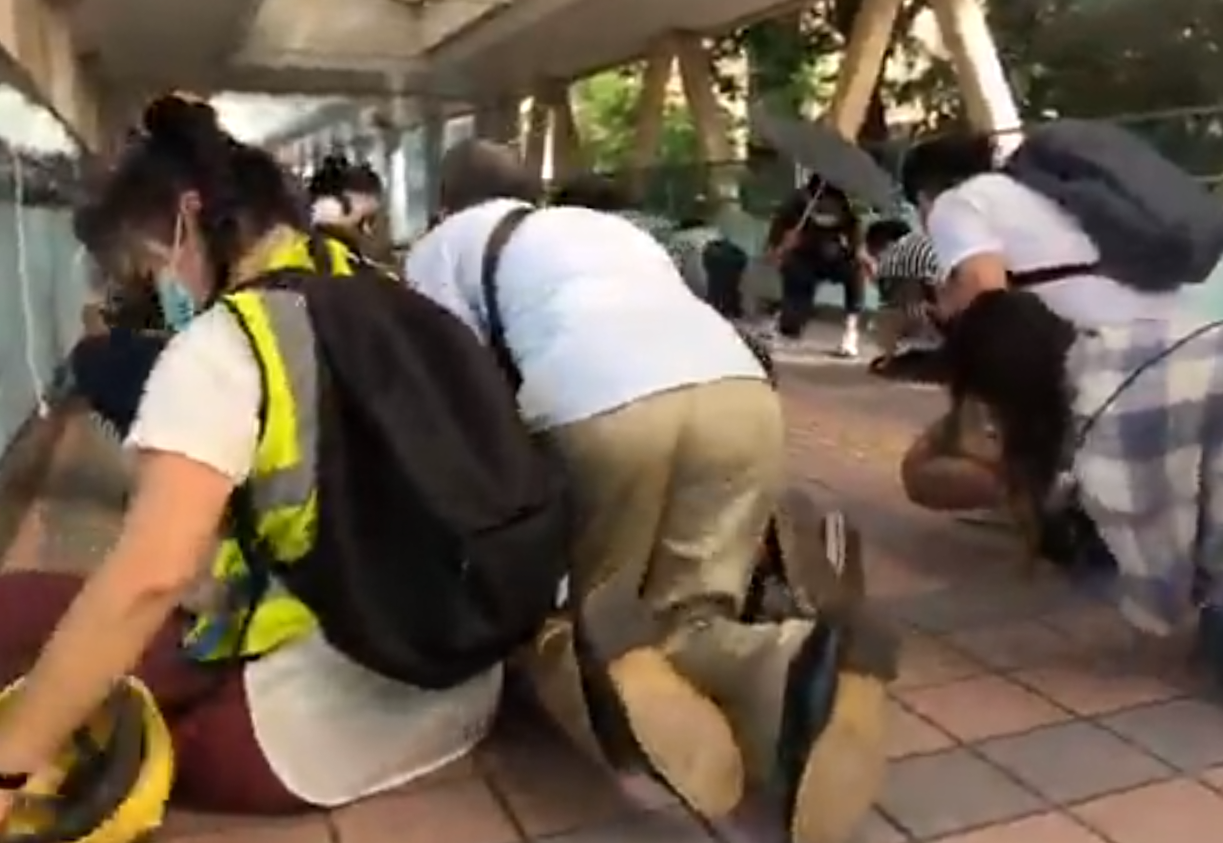
During the dispersal of Causeway Road, the police repeatedly fired pepper ball guns at the people and reporters on the flyover.

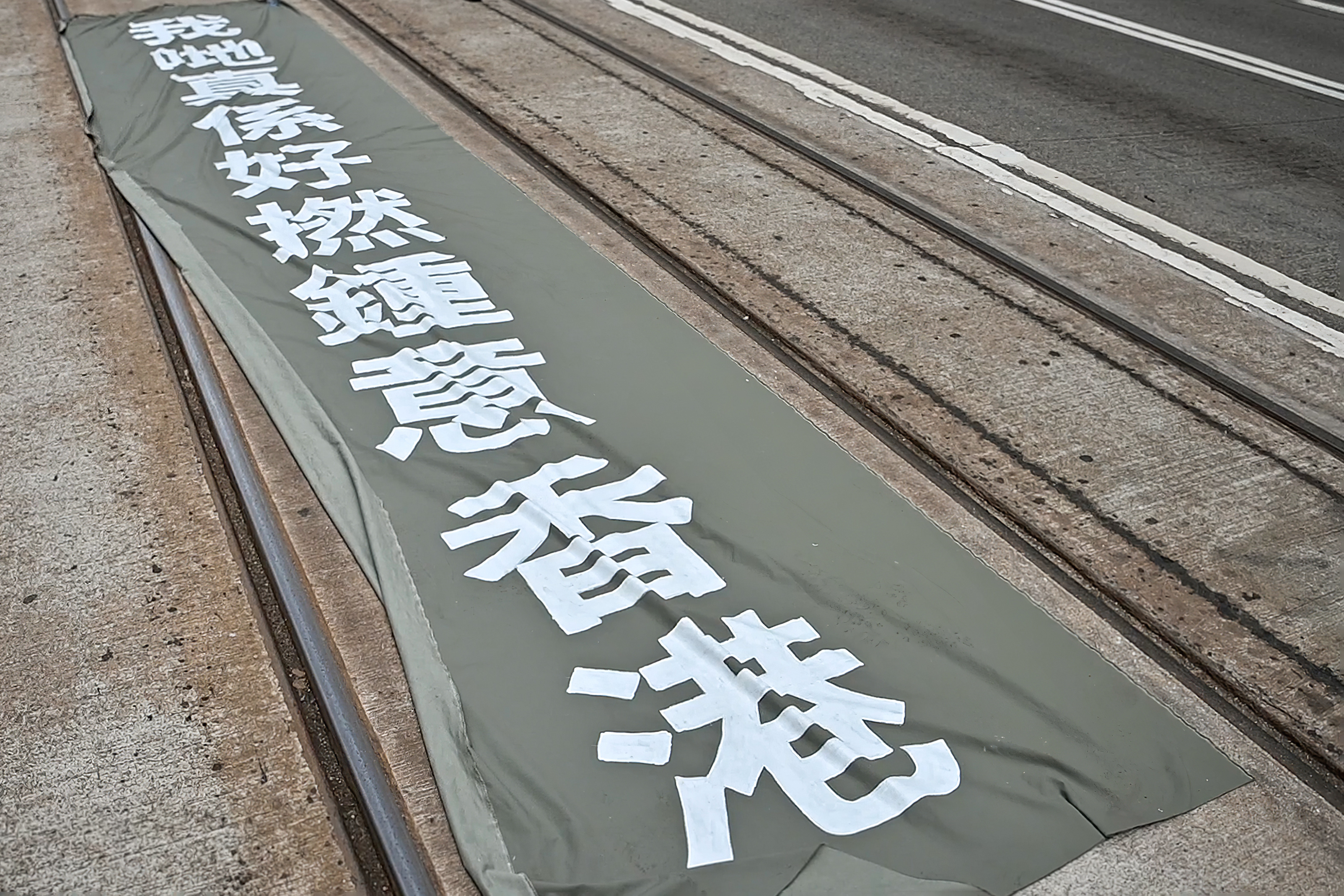
Someone spread out a large straight flag on the tramway off CNT Center in Wan Chai, saying "We really love Hong Kong."

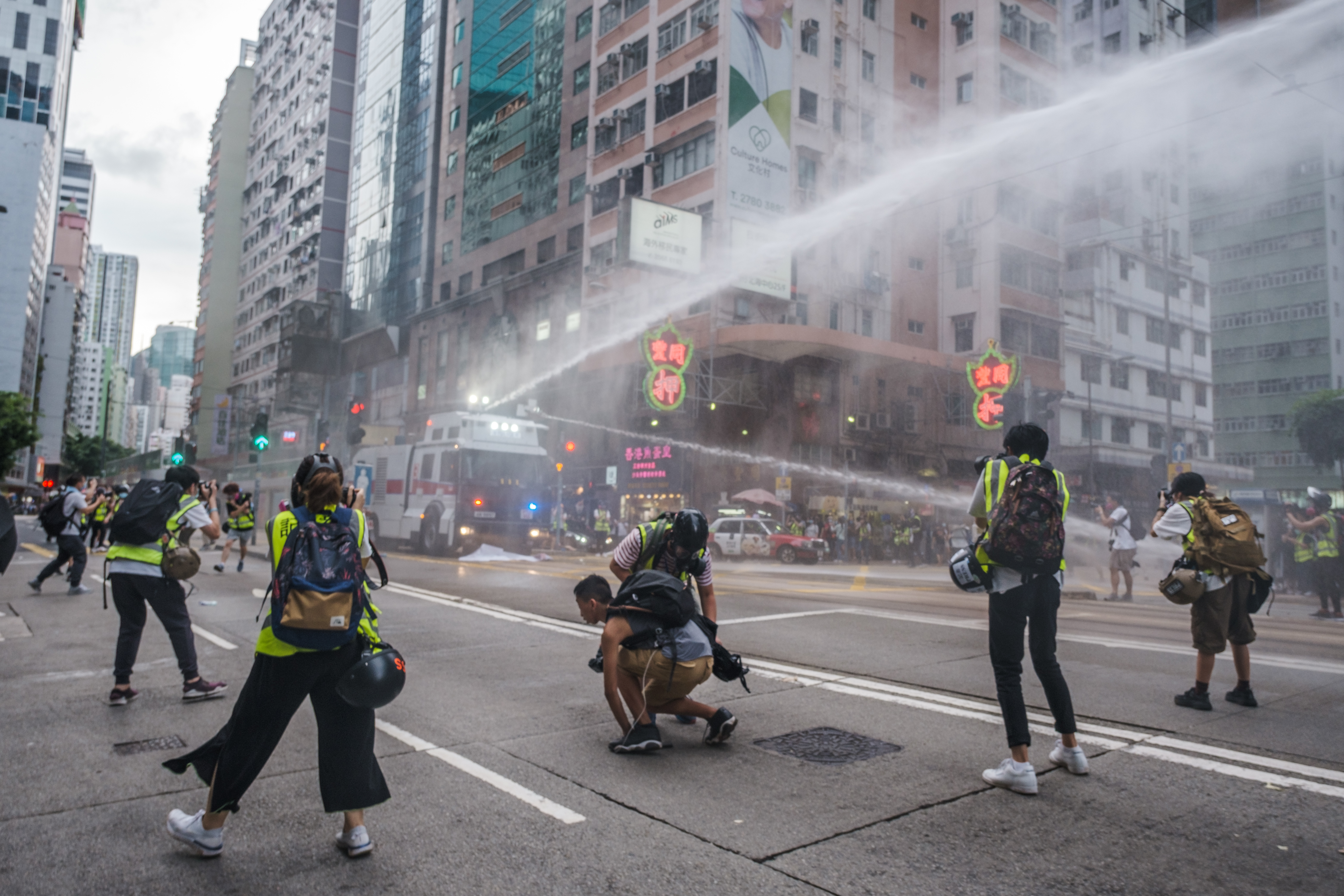
Police water cannon vehicles fired water jets on Hennessy Road in Wan Chai to disperse crowds and reporters.

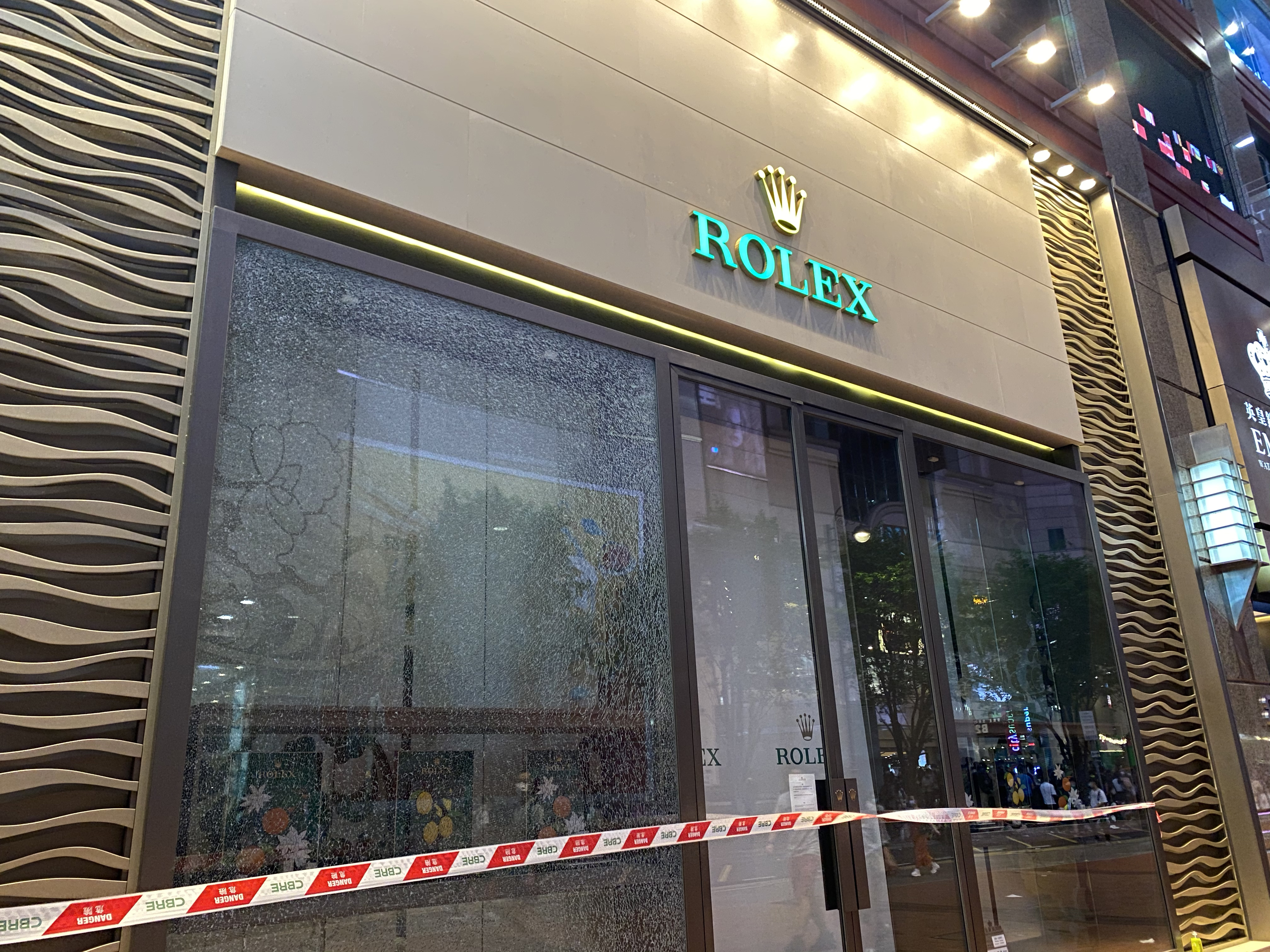
The glass of a watch shop on Russell Street was damaged by a pepper ball gun fired by the police.

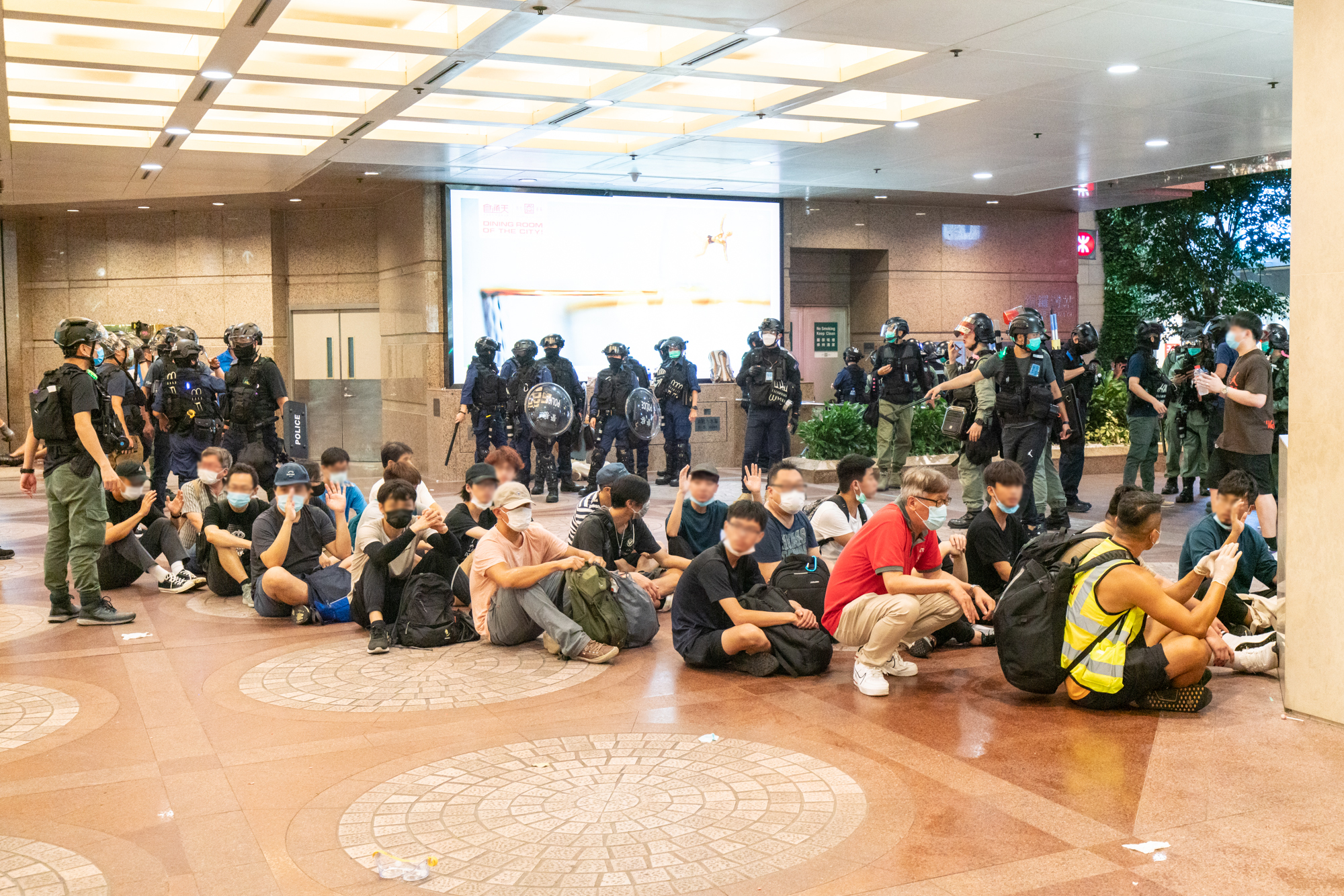
At around 7:30 pm, the police surrounded Times Square, and a large number of citizens were arrested in the underground covered square.

==== UK response to the National Security Law ====
Prime Minister Boris Johnson declared in the House of Commons that the Hong Kong National Security Law was a "clear and serious breach" of the 1984 Sino-British Joint Declaration.

Johnson also announced plans to extend UK residency rights to British National (Overseas) of Hong Kong passport holders and their dependents who would be permitted to apply for five-year visas to reside in the UK, including the right to work and study without restrictions. After five years they can, under normal British nationality law, apply for settled status and then subsequently for citizenship.

=== 2 July ===
==== International responses ====
The United States Congress unanimously passed the Hong Kong Autonomy Act after Senate approval seven days earlier, on 25 June.

The Australian government began drafting a Hong Kong safe haven pathway for pro-democracy Hong Kong protesters. Australian Prime Minister Scott Morrison stated that offering support to threatened Hong Kong people was "very consistent with who we are as a people and very consistent practically with the views that we've expressed."

==== Other developments ====
Democracy activist Nathan Law announced that he had left Hong Kong for an undisclosed location, out of safety concerns. Days later it became known that he was in London.

=== 3 July ===
==== Hong Kong government actions ====
A man arrested on 1 July became the first person being charged of "breaching the national security law", articles 21 and 22 and of terrorism, article 24.

The Hong Kong Education Bureau sent a late night notice to all schools in Hong Kong demanding that the newly enacted national security legislation will be taught and enforced in all public and private schools, including special education schools, in every single grade level starting in Kindergarten. The Bureau will support developing curriculum and assessment, the notice stated, and requests all stake holders – educators, administrators, social workers – work together to "enhance national identity".

==== International response against National Security Law ====
The government of Canada announced that it would suspend its extradition agreement with Hong Kong in response to the provisions of the Hong Kong national security law. Furthermore, Canada is considering a "pathway to citizenship", a priority point system, to accept young (18–23 years old), university-bound students who have been participating in the pro-democracy protests. The eligibility of applicants of the scheme could be limited to those between the age of 18–35.

Japanese legislators were asking the Japanese government to cancel the summit and state visit of Xi Jinping. The draft resolution stated that Japan should not ignore the worsening situation and should take a stance to show support to the Hong Kong pro-democracy citizens.

A total of 27 countries' governments condemned the national security law: Australia, Austria, Belgium, Belize, Canada, Denmark, Estonia, Finland, France, Iceland, Ireland, Germany, Japan, Latvia, Liechtenstein, Lithuania, Luxembourg, Marshall Islands, Netherlands, New Zealand, Norway, Palau, Slovakia, Slovenia, Sweden, Switzerland, and the U.K.

Global climate and human rights advocacy group NOW! launched #FridaysForFreedom in support of Hong Kong's pro-democracy movement. Participants are asked to stand in front of their country's Chinese embassy and consulate with related Hong Kong signage.

==== International support for National Security Law ====
At the UN Human Rights Council in Geneva, 53 countries voiced their support for the national security law, with 27 countries voicing opposition. The list of supporting countries as uncovered by Axios comprised: China, Antigua and Barbuda, Bahrain, Belarus, Burundi, Cambodia, Cameroon, Central African Republic, Comoros, Congo-Brazzaville, Cuba, Djibouti, Dominica, Egypt, Equatorial Guinea, Eritrea, Gabon, Gambia, Guinea, Guinea-Bissau, Iran, Iraq, Kuwait, Laos, Lebanon, Lesotho, Mauritania, Morocco, Mozambique, Myanmar, Nepal, Nicaragua, Niger, North Korea, Oman, Pakistan, Palestine, Papua New Guinea, Saudi Arabia, Sierra Leone, Somalia, South Sudan, Sri Lanka, Sudan, Suriname, Syria, Tajikistan, Togo, UAE, Venezuela, Yemen, Zambia and Zimbabwe.

==== Other developments ====
The State Council of China appointed Zheng Yanxiong as director of the National Security Office.

=== 4 July ===
==== Hong Kong public libraries censor pro-democracy literature ====
Freedom of press, of publication, and of information are guaranteed by Hong Kong Basic Law Article 27, but according to multiple newspapers and confirmed by the Leisure and Cultural Services Department (LCSD) of Hong Kong in a query by RTHK, various libraries in Hong Kong have begun reviewing their collections for items deemed violating the national security law. Such books will not be available on the catalog for reference or for borrowing in the meantime. An AFP reporter was unable to locate books written by activist Joshua Wong, pro-democratic lawmaker Tanya Chan and local scholar Chin Wan at a local library branch in the afternoon of 4 July. The library staff said that the collection of books was not large, and that not all books by those authors involved are reviewed. The RTHK article rendered a statement by LCSD which said that the collections of the Hong Kong Public Library must comply with the provisions of and not violate Hong Kong laws. However, according to the IFLA/UNESCO Public Library Manifesto 1994 mentioned in the LCSD Public Library page, the collections and services of public libraries "should not be subject to any ideological, political or religious censorship, [...]". In addition to the possibility of violating the Manifesto, foreign media were also alarmed by the removal of such books and expressed concerns that Hong Kong's speech and academic freedom would be under pressure. In fact, although many university presidents had jointly announced support for the national security law on 1 June, a month before the details were announced, and although they vowed to protect academic freedom at the universities, many university professors expressed concern when interviewed by Science magazine. As for local bookstores, the books removed from the library are still on sale in parts of Hong Kong. In the bookstores of Mong Kok and Causeway Bay, some bookstore staff explained that these books were older and may only have fewer reprints. In one of the bookstores in Mong Kok, a collection of "Rebellion under Tyranny" published by the Chinese Christian Church, the words "Liberate Hong Kong, Revolution of Our Times" on the back cover of the book were covered by adhesive tape.

==== DNA samples taken from arrestees ====
South China Morning Post reported that the 10 individuals arrested and charged of violating the newly enacted national security law have had their hair and saliva DNA samples taken by the police. Citing Police Force Ordinance 59C(2a), police claimed it is within the law that they collect these 10 arrestees' DNA samples. However, 59C states that the police is only authorized to collect non-intimate samples when two conditions are simultaneously met: one, that they suspect that "the person from whom the non-intimate sample is to be taken has committed a serious arrestable offence", and two, that they believe "the sample will tend to confirm or disprove the commission of the offence by that person"[59C(2b)] It is unclear how the possessions of pro-democracy verbiage flags, flyers, and stickers can be classified as "serious arrestable offense", nor was it necessary to prove that the alleged offence was committed by the person (from whom the DNA sample was taken) in this case. According to Hong Kong lawyer Lawrence Lok Ying-kam who specializes in criminal cases, Hong Kong police is not authorized to take sample in this case, and he speculated that the main purpose of extracting DNA is to intimidate the arrestees.

=== 5 July ===
==== Discrepancies between Chinese and English versions of the national security law ====
The Official Languages Ordinance of Hong Kong has always granted equal legal status to legislation in both Chinese and English. When the Chinese version of the National Security Law passed on 30 June in Beijing, there was no complete, Hong Kong official English version immediately available on the government website; only a 3-paragraph on the first page of the Chinese version footnoting the official English name of the law was gazetted on the website, and a separate English version published via GoogleDoc on Xinhua official website. Discrepancies between the two versions begin to surface after days of analyzing and comparing the two. Lawyer Alan Wong Hok-ming pointed out a few "poor translations" from article 9, 10, and 29, for example, where the word "Universities" were added in the English version that was not found in the Chinese version. When asked by South China Morning Post, the Department of Justice confirmed that Chinese would be the official language of the new law because "it was a national law enacted by the standing committee [of National People's Congress in Beijing]". Basic Law Committee member Priscilla Leung Mei-fun also defended the government's decision of Chinese prevailing over English, but legal experts questioned the legality of such claim. For example, English-speaking judges of Hong Kong who can't read Chinese may not be able to uphold justice when the law was not gazetted officially in English, and the court cannot assume English-speaking-only citizens' knowledge of the Chinese version, a former assistant solicitor general of the colonial-era Legal Department Michael Blanchflower stated. To some, the discrepancies between Chinese and the unofficial English version of the law played well into the on-going judges selection debate. In fact, although Carrie Lam rejected calls to use only Chinese nationals to preside over cases and brushed it off as "unrealistic", one day later, Zhang Yong, vice-chairman of the Legislative Affairs Commission of the National People's Congress Standing Committee, made statements that superseded those of Lam, through voicing his concerns that judges heading national security cases should be Chinese nationals only to avoid justice being compromised by "dual allegiance" because of their foreign nationality.

==== Boycott Mulan movement ====
The #BoycottMulan hashtag has begun to resurface in Thailand. Concurrent with the recent South Korea protest on 1 July demanding that the film Mulan be scrapped, Thai users have been trending #BoycottMulan to show solidarity with the Hong Kong pro-democracy protest movement against China's national security law. To many, Mulan, the legendary female warrior who disguised as a man to join the army in the place of her father, symbolizes a freedom fighter against oppression. The hashtag #BoycottMulan began last year in August when pro-China naturalized American citizen Liu Yifei posted on Twitter that she supported the Hong Kong police. Days later, Twitter reportedly shut down more than 200,000 "#SupportMulan" accounts.

=== 6 July ===
==== Blank sheet protests ====
A "Lunch with You" event took place at IFC mall in Central. Pixelated slogans, along with white sheets of paper, were held up. Police arrived later and conducted stop and search.

Protected by Hong Kong Basic Law Article 27 to peaceful assembly, demonstration, and processions, many gathered in the apm mall in Kwun Tong with blank sheets to protest the National Security Law's restrictions to the freedom of expression, following a viral news article from 1 July about a girl who held up a blank placard while watching police round up protesters nearby. Police entered the shopping mall by force and arrested three middle-aged women on charges of "obstructing the police". A total of 8 were arrested on various charges.

==== RTHK interview with US Consul General ====
Hanscom Smith, US Consul General to Hong Kong and Macau, said it was a "tragedy" to use the national security law to "erode fundamental freedoms and to create an atmosphere of coercion and self-censorship". He stated in a RTHK podcast that it was the opaque handling of the law that didn't follow Hong Kong legislative processes that created uncertainty in the society. When questioned by the host how he justified other countries such as the US also have similar national security legislation, Smith stated that the US was a democratic country that followed legislative protocols with checks and balances, and Beijing had none. Hours later, Hong Kong government stated its disagreement with Smith's position, and Chief Secretary of Administration Matthew Cheung and Secretary for Security John Lee will meet with Smith to express their concerns.

==== Review and removal of pro-democracy books from schools ====
The Hong Kong Education Bureau ordered schools to review and remove items from their curriculum and libraries that violate the newly enacted national security law, unless these books are to "positively teach" students. The Education Bureau further reaffirmed to Reuters that because schools are the "gatekeepers" for their teaching resources, therefore school management and teachers should review "all teaching materials, including books" that may violate the national security law. Many school principals requested for more details and clarity. A Baptist University lecturer pointed out in a South China Morning Post interview, "books written by political leaders such as Nelson Mandela and Mahatma Gandhi [involving organising civil disobedience acts] may also be banned," under the vague directive.

=== 7 July ===
==== Article 43 implementation rules effective immediately ====
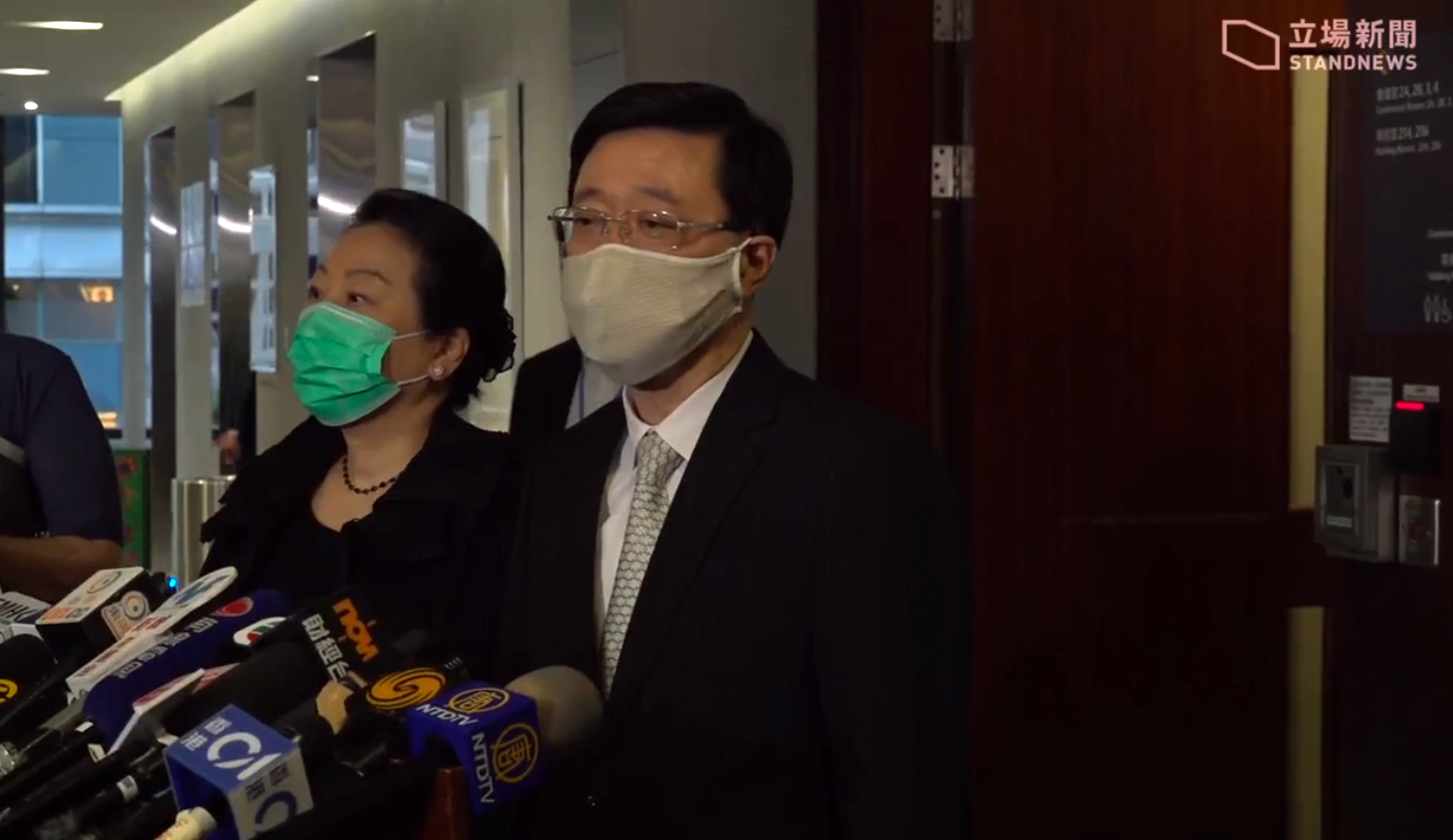
Secretary for Justice Teresa Cheng and Secretary for Security John Lee meet with reporters after attending the joint meeting

Details have been vague in the newly Beijing-enacted national security law. Effective midnight of 7 July, the Article 43 Implementation Rules listed seven details ranging from freezing assets, limiting travels, to granting more power to police to conduct searches without warrants. Under Article 37, Hong Kong Basic Law prohibits "unlawful search of a citizen's person". However, lawyer and Hong Kong Executive Council member Ronny Tong Ka-wah speculated that not requiring warrants before conducting searches can expedite arrest and "prevent evidence from being destroyed meanwhile". The rules continue to grant police power to ask social media platforms for user details whom they deem as national security threats. Facebook (and its subsidiary WhatsApp), Google, Twitter, and Telegram so far all expressed their refusal to comply while awaiting international consensus regarding the legality of the law. In an interview with Fortune, Yaqiu Wang, a China researcher with the nonprofit Human Rights Watch, stated that the law could be "easily abused by authorities to punish people for peacefully expressing critical views of the Chinese or Hong Kong government." In the same article, Julian Gewirtz, a China expert and then-research fellow at Harvard, worried that companies which have been comfortably operating in Hong Kong are now suddenly burdened by the vague and legally ambiguous law.

==== IPAC for no Hong Kong extradition ====
The Inter-Parliamentary Alliance on China (IPAC) is a newly formed organization of 34 legislators from 16 democratic countries [the numbers since increased] dedicated to safeguarding international rules based order, upholding human rights, promoting trade fairness, strengthening security, protecting national integrity. Its first campaign is to convince countries not to allow extraditions to Hong Kong and to suspend extradition treaties with Hong Kong. Their website listed Australia, Czechia, France, Germany, the Netherlands, New Zealand, the United Kingdom and the United States as IPAC member countries that have extradition treaties with Hong Kong. Overall, Hong Kong has extradition treaties with 39 territories. Canada had suspended its extradition treaty on 3 July and Australia did so on 9 July.

==== Australia enhanced travel warning ====
Australian government's official travel website updated its warning to travellers and to Australian passport holders residing in Hong Kong, advising the latter group: "If you're concerned about the new law, reconsider your need to remain in Hong Kong."

=== 8 July ===
==== Converting a hotel into the National Security Office ====
The official Beijing-led National Security office was inaugurated in Causeway Bay, a Hong Kong protest hotspot, inside a 4-star hotel. The inaugural ceremony was held at 8am with water-filled barricades and heavy police presence. The public only learned of the arrangement the day before. Since about midnight heavy barricades were moved in, and the emblem of the People's Republic of China was placed on the front of the hotel entrance. During the ceremony reporters were not allowed through the barricades. The hotel, formerly known as MetroPark hotel managed by China's state-owned China Travel Service, has had a "construction in progress" sign for several days now, and its website is currently down for "maintenance", and according to Hong Kong Free Press, it's been down for about a week. The office is leased for at least six months, and is termed "the most luxurious Chinese Communist Party office" by The News Lens.

==== Protest anthem banned in schools ====
Hours after the National Security office was unveiled, and only one day after Carrie Lam's public statement reaffirming that the National Security law "will not undermine human rights and freedoms", Education Bureau minister Kevin Yeung stated in a written response that pro-democracy protest-related activities such as forming human chains or chanting songs – specifically the protest anthem Glory to Hong Kong – are banned in all schools. Human chains, or the Baltic Way, is a peaceful political demonstration originated in 1989 by Baltic's pro-independence wishing to secede from the Communist Soviet Union. On the other hand, "Glory to Hong Kong", possibly inspired by "Do You Hear The People Sing" from Les Misérables, was a made-in-Hong-Kong, crowd-sourced, did-it-yourselves "protest anthem" that became world famous during the year-long protest movement. Whereas Article 27 of Hong Kong Basic Law guarantees citizens' freedom of speech, of "assembly, of procession and of demonstration", Yeung concluded that children's right to free expression "is not absolute" and requested that schools take action to prevent such "violations" from occurring.

==== Legality of the Legislative Council primaries ====
Secretary for Constitutional and Mainland Affairs Erick Tsang stated in an interview with Oriental Daily News that the organizer of the primaries and the candidates may be in breach of National Security Law articles 20, 22, and 29. Whereas Hong Kong Basic Law article 26 guarantees citizens and permanent residents of Hong Kong "the right to vote and the right to stand for election in accordance with [the Basic] law," Tsang warned citizens to pay heed to the potential violations of the "Prevention and Control of Disease (Requirement and Directions) (Business and Premises) Regulation (Cap. 599F), commonly known as social-distance regulation, to avoid citations and arrests. Pro-democracy legislators historically constituted less than half of the Legislative Council. In the wake of the year-long pro-democracy movement and after the record turnout and the landslide win in November's District Council election, pro-democracy candidates began to emerge and vowed to take over more than half of the 70-seat Legislative Council election in September. It is hoped that this primary and its result would strategies their win against the pro-China majority party. In an earlier interview with the Stand News, Benny Tai, the organizer of this year's primary and a Hong Kong University assistant professor in law, expressed that he is mentally ready for police disruption at polling stations, and he anticipated that the Hong Kong government will use any excuse to disqualify these pro-democracy candidates, both before and after the September election, something that the government has done in the past.

==== Hong Kong University Students' Union "Fear Not" statement ====
The Hong Kong University management began "cleaning up" protest banners and posters on campus. They argued that while there is a designated "Lennon Wall" space for free speech, the slogans "Liberate Hong Kong, Revolution of our Times", and "Hong Kong Independence" violated the newly Beijing-enacted National Security Law. In addition, they claimed that the structural poles and columns adjacent to the designated space were not part of the agreed space and therefore they, while respecting students' freedom of speech, would continue to periodically clean up any wordings deemed inappropriate or illegal. In response, on 8 July, the Hong Kong University Students' Union published a declaration on their Facebook page, with the title "Statement that the Hong Kong University Students' Union fears not of the National Security Law". In addition to restating their earlier opposition to the National Security Law, they also proclaimed that the insertion of the word "Universities" in the discrepant English version of the National Security Law had "dealt a blow" to the university's "[i]nstitutional autonomy and academic freedom". The statement concluded with a vow to "fight against malignancy."

==== Protest-related journalism award ====
AFP photographer Anthony Wallace's coverage on the Hong Kong protest between June and December 2019 won this year's Ville de Perignan Remi Ochlik Award in the Visa pour l'Image International Festival of Photojournalism. The title of his winning work was "Opposing Views", in which a photograph captured during "Occupy Airport" and a young man being pinned down by police in a protest were featured.

=== 9 July ===
==== Australia suspends Hong Kong extradition treaty ====
Australia suspended its extradition treaty with Hong Kong (which has been in place since 1993) and offered to extend visas by five years for Hong Kong residents currently in the country, and opening a pathway to permanent residency for up to 10,000 people working and studying in Australia. The government has also warned the more than 100,000 Australians in Hong Kong that they "may be at increased risk of detention on vaguely defined national security grounds. You could break the law without intending to. If you're concerned about the new law, reconsider your need to remain in Hong Kong".

=== 10 July ===
==== Police raid Pan-democratic primaries polling office ====
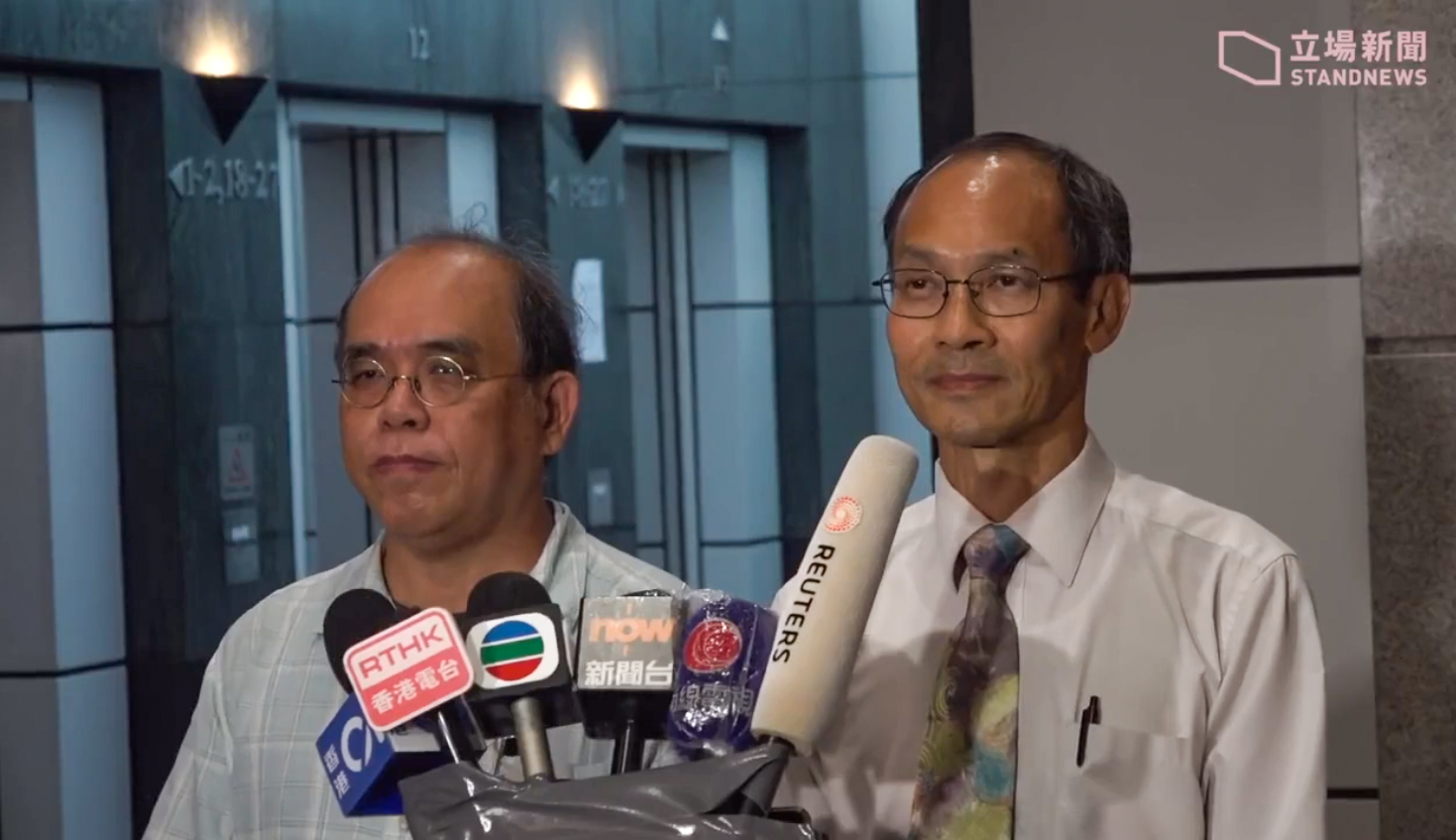
At 1 am, Robert Chung (right), Chairman of the Hong Kong Public Opinion Research Institute, and Chung Kim-wah (left), Deputy Chief Executive, met with reporters

Police raided the offices of the Hong Kong Public Opinion Research Institute (PORI), a polling firm that was working with the pan-democracy camp, the night before the pan-democracy camp's primaries for the upcoming legislative election. According to Hong Kong Free Press, police accused the organization for "dishonest use of computers", claiming that someone named "Tony Mike" told pro-Beijing state-run newspaper Wen Wei Po on Thursday that PORI does not erase interviewees' personal data collected from past surveys, claiming that the data had been hacked and leaked. Although with a court warrant, the organizer and a team of PORI lawyers refused the police's request to hand over all the computer units. As a result, police stayed at the premise for several hours, going through each computer unit and writing down notes for further investigation. Police also gave an oral promise that the taken data will not be used for other investigations (such as those protest-related). No equipment was taken, and no arrests were made. Due to this incident, the primaries originally scheduled to begin at 9am the next day have been postponed till 12 noon.

=== 11 July ===
==== Day one of two first Pan-democratic primaries ====
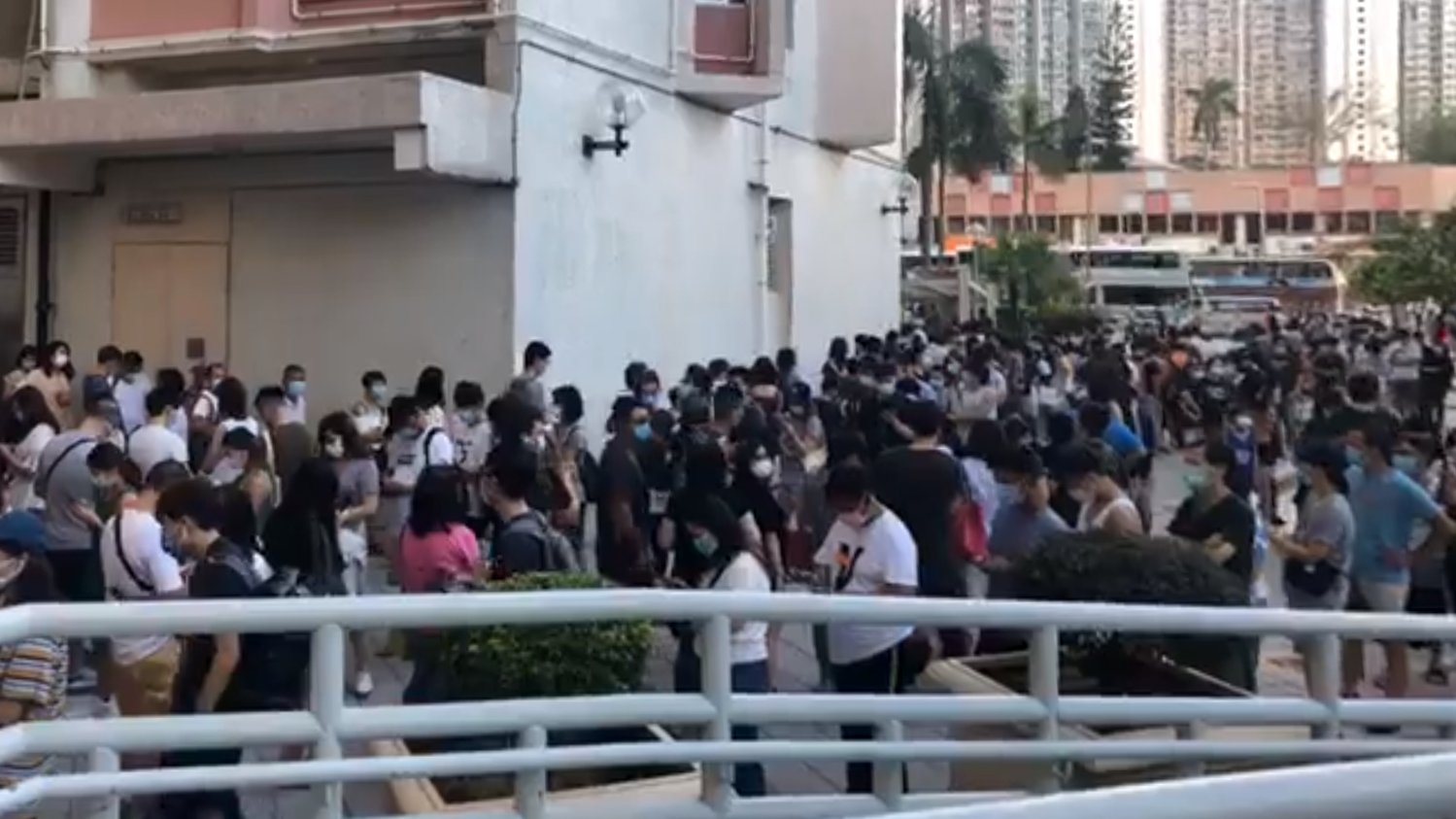
More than 400 people in Tin Shui Village, Tin Shui Wai, were waiting to vote during the peak afternoon

With the original 2-day total estimated voter turnout being 170,000, over 220,000 Hong Kongers cast their ballots on the first day at over 250 polling stations throughout Hong Kong in hope to unseat the pro-Beijing establishment party, the DAB, in the Legislative Council election in September.

==== Anti-national security law protest march in Paris, France ====
Hundreds of pro-democracy protesters took to the street in Paris to voice their opposition against the imposition of the national security law in Hong Kong. The protest was organized by AfricaHongKongFrance (AHKF), a newly formed alliance group of Hong Kongers and Africans living in France, Cerveaux non disponibles, a French media outlet, and Mouvement Yoallahsuuren led by Mimo Dia Leydimen. Participants included French senator André Gattolin, French supporters, Africans, Uyghurs, Taiwanese, East Turkestan Asians and Hong Kongers living or studying in France. In a promotional YouTube video published on its website, AHKF announced that this peaceful march was a "call upon all the Yellow Vests, sympathisers, to all the political refugees, exiled, the outraged, the weak and the mad people to pressure [French President] Emmanuel Macron and make him condemn firmly and immediately China [...]". Many participants were seen holding up blank sheets of paper as their "silent slogan". In his Facebook page, Mimo Dia Leydimen stressed the importance of solidarity with African brothers and sisters under the increasing totalitarian Chinese presence in Africa after launching its "Belt and Road" initiatives. The march began at Place de la Bastille and ended at Place de la Republique. The event ended peacefully with police presence throughout the march.

=== 12 July ===
==== Day two of primaries ====
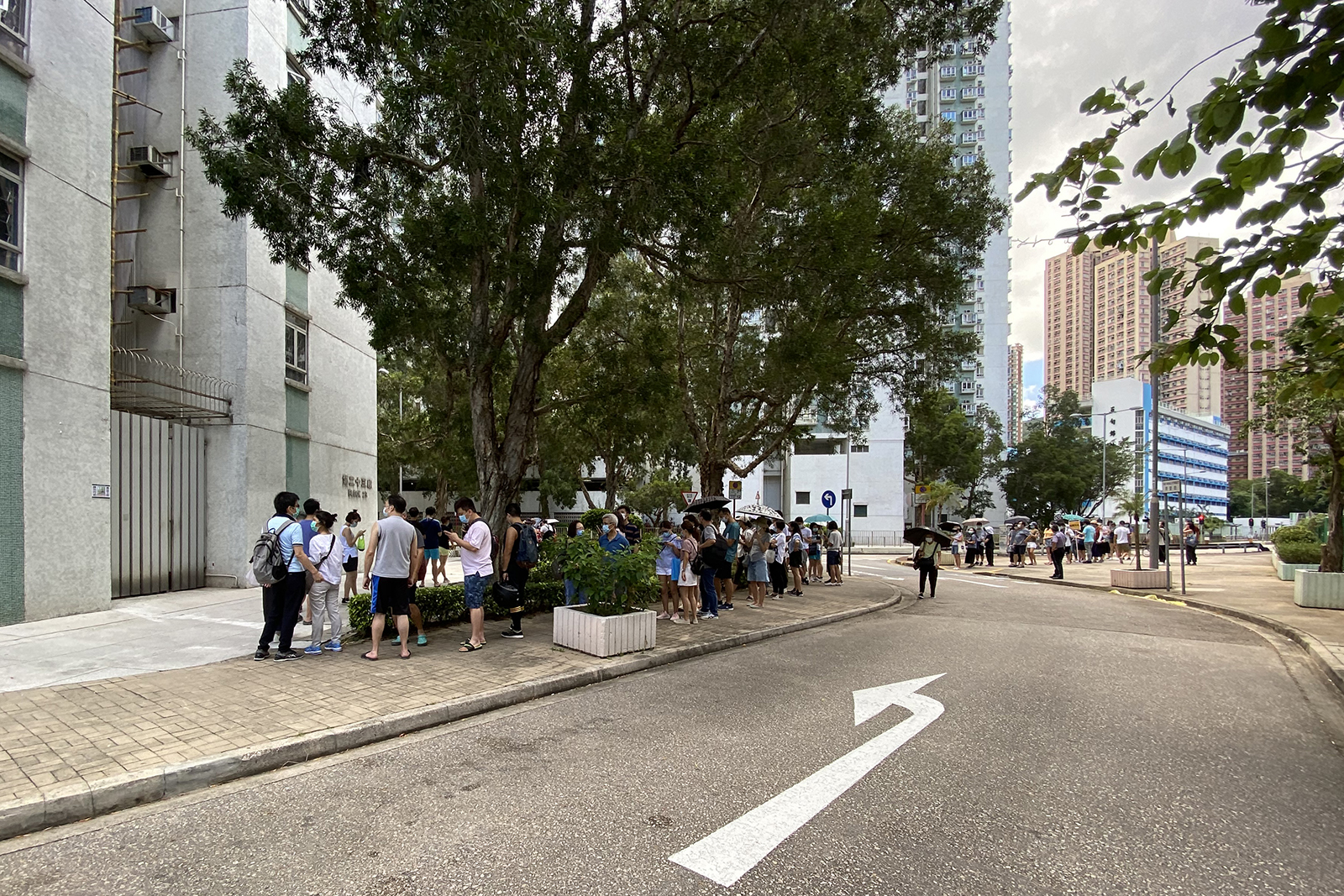
A polling station in City One Shatin was put into operation, and more than 100 citizens had lined up in the morning

In total, over 610,000 voters participated in the primaries, almost four times greater than the original estimate by the pollster organization. The high turnout should serve as "proxy referendum against the national security law", said a pro-democracy candidate Eddie Chu as reported by BBC.

==== Protest march in Tokyo, Japan ====
Hundreds of Taiwanese, Hong Kongers, Uyghurs, Mongolians, and Tibetans living in Japan took to the streets to voice their opposition against the Communist Chinese government. The organizer of this joint protest, Japan Uyghur Association and Stand with Hong Kong, denounced the increasing hostile intimidation and militant tactics of the Communist party to its neighboring regions and urged the Japanese government to scrap Xi Jinping's scheduled state visit.

=== 13 July ===
==== "Primaries may breach national security law" ====
Both the Liaison Office of the Central People's Government in Hong Kong and Hong Kong chief executive Carrie Lam denounced the democratic primaries as a possible breach of the national security law.

=== 14 July ===
==== International response: US President signed Hong Kong Autonomy Act and executive order on Hong Kong Normalization ====
Passed unanimously first by the House of Representative on 25 June and on 2 July by the Senate, US President Donald Trump signed the Hong Kong Autonomy Act into law, ending Hong Kong's preferential treatment as an autonomous region. This bill has a 90-day window for the Secretary of State to impose sanctions on "a foreign person [who] is materially contributing to, has materially contributed to, or attempts to materially contribute to the failure of the Government of China to meet its obligations under the Joint Declaration or the Basic Law". Trump also signed into law an executive order detailing 14 actions to stop treating Hong Kong as a special and independent region. The normalization measures include that Hong Kong SAR passport holders will be treated the same as Chinese passport holders, scientific and technical cooperation between the Chinese University of Hong Kong and the United States Geological Survey – which had previously expired – will not be renewed, and Hong Kong police training in the United States will be ended. In a press conference, Trump stated that Hong Kong people's "freedoms have been taken away" when China enacted its national security law in Hong Kong, and that because of that, "Hong Kong will now be treated the same as mainland China" by the United States.

==== VPN companies relocating Hong Kong servers ====
Virtual Private Networks, VPNs, allow users to create secured connections to another network over the Internet, protect one's browsing history and passwords, and shield users from other suspicious public WIFI activities. Two VPN providers, Tunnel Bear and Private Internet Access (PIA), have announced on the 13th and the 14th, respectively, that they will remove their physical servers from Hong Kong to protect their users' privacy in light of the uncertainty created by Beijing's national security law in Hong Kong. Both companies stressed that they do not store personal identifiable information, and that, more than ever, it is imperative to continue providing service to Hong Kong users. Other VPN providers, such SurfSharks, are watching the situation closely and expressed that they would immediately shut down VPN servers located in Hong Kong if they ever received "requirements from authorities to start logging user activity".

=== 15 July ===
==== New York Times to move Asia headquarters from Hong Kong to South Korea ====
The New York Times announced that it will move its Asia headquarters' digital team of journalists, approximately one third of its staff, from Hong Kong to Seoul, South Korea, in response to the uncertainty created by the national security law. The Times said that securing work permits for its workers has become increasing challenging recently, and while that was commonplace in China, it has never been an issue in Hong Kong. One such journalist is Chris Buckley, who has been working out of the Hong Kong office after Chinese authorities in May declined to renew his work visa and thus effectively expelled him from his 24-year stationing in China. Hong Kong, a special administrative region (SAR) that guarantees its people the freedom of press according to Basic Law article 27, has declined to approve Buckley's work visa application to work in Hong Kong without giving a specific reason. The Times reiterated that it will continue to maintain a large presence in Hong Kong and has "every intention of maintaining our coverage of Hong Kong and China", but it feels the need to form contingency plans and diversify its geographical spread amid the new national security law reality.

==== International response: Czechia ready to withdraw from Hong Kong extradition agreement ====
Czechia (or Czech Republic) and Hong Kong established their extradition agreement in 2014. However, citing Article 38 of the newly enacted national security law, that the law "shall apply to offences...committed against the Hong Kong Special Administrative Region from outside the Region by a person who is not a permanent resident of the Region", Czech is now mulling to terminate the agreement. "The question of the possibility of abusing extradition for the political prosecution of persons who have expressed their dissenting position in the Czech Republic is something for which we should consider whether to withdraw from this extradition agreement", according to Minister Petříček. He further stressed that China's signal to step above Hong Kong will not "go unanswered".

==== Protest-related journalism award ====
South China Morning Post journalist Dayu Zhang won this year's Lorenzo Natali Media Grand Prize with his work titled "The 'thin yellow line' standing between Hong Kong police and protestors". The 8-minute long video captured moments of a community group of elderly seeking to defuse tensions between protestors and police in the summer of the pro-democracy protests in 2019. The Lorenzo Natali Media Prize was launched in 1992 to recognize and celebrate excellence in reporting on sustainable development issues. It was named after Lorenzo Natali, a precursor of European development policy. Today, the Lorenzo Natali Media Prize help create a platform supporting journalism for sustainable development. The Prize also "gives a voice to those whose vital message is often overlooked or ignored."

=== 16 July ===
==== Taiwan officials left Hong Kong, refused to sign "One China" declaration in work visa renewal ====
The Taipei Economic and Cultural Office in Hong Kong (TECO) serves as an unofficial embassy for Taiwanese living in or working in Hong Kong. In light of the recent enactment of the national security law, the Hong Kong government has asked multiple Taiwan officials to sign a 4-point declaration before their work visa can be granted. However, at least three of five top TECO officials have refused to sign such document and thus returned to Taiwan due to expired work visa. Point 1 of the document, as reported by Up Media, stated that TECO must promise to "acknowledge the 'One China' policy, the Hong Kong Basic Law, and all Hong Kong laws, and TECO must not interfere with Hong Kong's internal affairs, must not hurt Hong Kong's prosperity and stability, and must not embarrass the Hong Kong government." While the relationship between Taiwan and China has always been precarious, there was a period of time when such endorsement-type document was not required between 2008 and 2016, during the presidency of KMT politician Ma Ying-jeou. Despite not having enough top officials on site in Hong Kong, TECO stated that their service remains intact and committed to both Taiwanese in Hong Kong and Hong Kongers seeking Taiwan support.

=== 17 July ===
==== UK judge statement on Hong Kong Final Court of Appeal ====
The President of the UK Supreme Court, The Right Hon Lord Reed of Allermuir, issued a statement titled "Role of UK judges on the Hong Kong Court of Final Appeal". The statement began with a summarized history of Hong Kong and UK's pre- and post-1997 judiciary agreements. Then the statement listed two current concerns that the court has, one concern being the vacant Final Appeal court judge position and the second being the challenge of upholding of Hong Kong judicial independence with the new national security law. Since 1997, Hong Kong and UK agreed that the House of Lords would provide two serving Law Lords to sit on the newly created Hong Kong Court of Final Appeal, and Article 82 of Basic Law requires that judges could be invited "from other common law jurisdictions to sit on the Court of Final Appeal". "Other common law jurisdictions" refers to Australia or Canada, according to the statement. However, since the retirement of one of the two Final Court of Appeal judges earlier this year Hong Kong has not yet filled this vacancy, and no one has been scheduled to take the seat until the end of the year, creating a judicial vacuum. The second concern is the potential erosion of judicial independence by the national security law. Article 85 of Basic Law states that the courts of the Hong Kong Special Administrative Region "shall exercise judicial power independently, free from any interference. Members of the judiciary shall be immune from legal action in the performance of their judicial functions." Lord Reed concluded his statement casting doubt whether "judges of the Supreme Court can continue to serve as judges in Hong Kong will depend on whether such service remains compatible with judicial independence and the rule of law."

==== Deutsche Bank moves its Asia-Pacific headquarters to Singapore ====
Deutsche Bank announced that it is moving its Asia-Pacific region headquarters from Hong Kong to Singapore.

=== 18 July ===
==== National security law: China removed mobile music game Cytus II over its music director's personal coded "separatist" song ====
The song, titled "Telegraph 1344 7609 2575", has been posted by Wilson "Ice" Lam since March on his personal SoundCloud account. Chinese internet users discovered and figured out that the secret Morse code translates to "Liberate Hong Kong, the revolution of our times" in Chinese, an alleged banned slogan under the new national security law. Although SoundCloud, same as YouTube, Facebook, and Twitter, is illegal in China due to the country's firewall, and while punishment to those illegal Internet users is largely unknown, China decided to remove the game Cytus II, of which Lam is the music director. Lam, in response, resigned immediately from the game company Rayark Games, claimed sole responsibility of the song and stood by his political beliefs.

=== 19 July ===
==== More uncertainty and confusion in the financial industry amid national security law ====
Two days after Deutsche Bank' s decision to leave Hong Kong, Reuters reported that at least four global banks are now scrutinizing their clients for their anti-government ties, coincidentally on the same day where two government organizations issued statements reassuring financial stability amid national security law. Whereas the main role of the Hong Kong Financial Secretary is to assist the Chief Executive in overseeing financial and economic policies, Hong Kong Securities and Futures Commission (SFC) is an independent statutory body set up in 1989 to regulate Hong Kong's securities and futures markets. HK Financial Secretary Paul Chan penned a letter to HKSFC Chief Executive Officer Ashley Alder on 17 July, stating that the national security law is "NOT intended to affect the way they conduct business, engage in market activities or allocate their capital." Two days later Alder affirmed that the many practices and activities shall remain unaltered and that "all related regulations will be administered by the SFC in the same manner as before the advent of the NSL." Contrary to what these two government organizations claimed, Reuters on the same day reported that bankers at Credit Suisse Group AG (CSGN.S), HSBC Holdings Plc (HSBA.L), Julius Baer Gruppe AG (BAER.S) and UBS Group AG (UBSG.S) are now vetting their clients’ public and private social media dating as far back as 2014 during the Umbrella Movement to check for their pro-democracy stance. According to Reuters, at least three wealth managers in Hong Kong say they are worried about the regulatory and reputation risks to their banks if charges are made against their pro-democracy clients. A top executive at a regional wealth manager also said that his firm's risk and compliance team prepared a list of top 10 Hong Kong individuals identified in local media as pro-democracy sympathisers within a couple of days of the enactment of the law on 1 July. It is worth noting that even before the enactment of the national security law, in November 2019, pro-Beijing HSBC had already terminated Spark Alliance HK's protest relief fund account, citing "money laundering" concerns in an effort to cut ties with pro-democracy protest organizations.

==== Yuen Long 721 anniversary march ====
Grassroot anti-government/pro-independence organization TSWConnection (Tin Shui Wai) marched within Yuen Long in protest of last year's Yuen Long Attack, the prolonged delay of police response at the time, and the lack of prosecution of these attackers after one year. A bigger, district-wide march request was submitted earlier but police had declined to issue "letter of no objection", citing pandemic concerns. As a result, the four TSWConnection founding members marched on their own around Yuen Long. 15 minutes into the march police began stop-and-search and pepper sprayed reporters and nearby onlookers in the midst of chaos. The 4-person group continued through various parts of Yuen Long where numerous citizens joined chanting and holding signs such as "corrupted cops", "police brutality" and "justice not served". The purple police warning sign "you may be breaching the national security law now" was held up by police twice in an attempt to disperse the crowd. After about 8 hours, 17 people were ticketed, 7 of which were district councilors, for violating "social distance ordinance 599G". Even though Public Order Ordinance 245 clearly states that "public meetings attended by not more than 50 persons, public meetings conducted in private premises attended by no more than 500 persons or public processions attended by not more than 30 persons do not require notification", police arrested the four TSWConnection members for "unlawful assembly".

=== 20 July ===
==== International response: United Kingdom suspends Hong Kong extradition treaty and extends China weapon embargo to Hong Kong ====
Due to "China's failure to live up to [its] international obligations with respect to Hong Kong", United Kingdom has suspended its extradition treaty with Hong Kong, immediately and indefinitely, and extended its arms embargo - which has been in place with China since 1989 - to Hong Kong. It also confirmed plans for a path to UK citizenship for around three million Hong Kongers. In his concluding remarks, Foreign Secretary Dominic Raab reiterated that these responses are "reasonable and proportionate".

==== Prominent South Korea tech company Naver to move out of Hong Kong ====
To avoid China gaining access to its user information under the national security law, Naver is moving its data center from Hong Kong to Singapore. User information has been deleted since earlier this month and the Hong Kong servers were reformatted. China government has not requested information from Naver, and no user information has been leaked, according to Naver.

=== 21 July ===
==== Yuen Long 721 anniversary mall protest ====
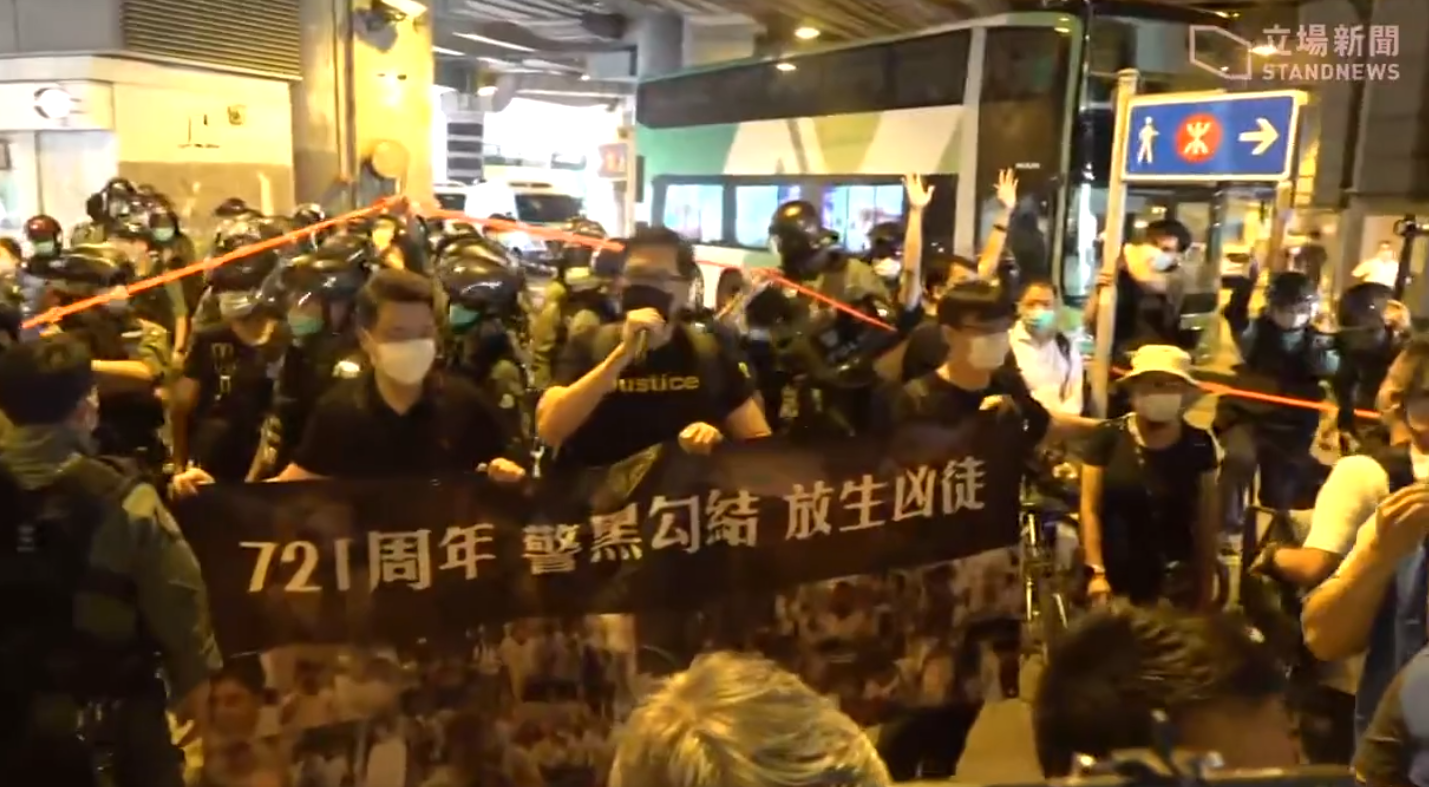
At 4 pm, Democratic Party Lam Cheuk-ting and Andrew Wan, together with the 2 injured in the 721 incident, a total of 4 people pulled up a banner of 'Police and criminals colluded and released murderers'

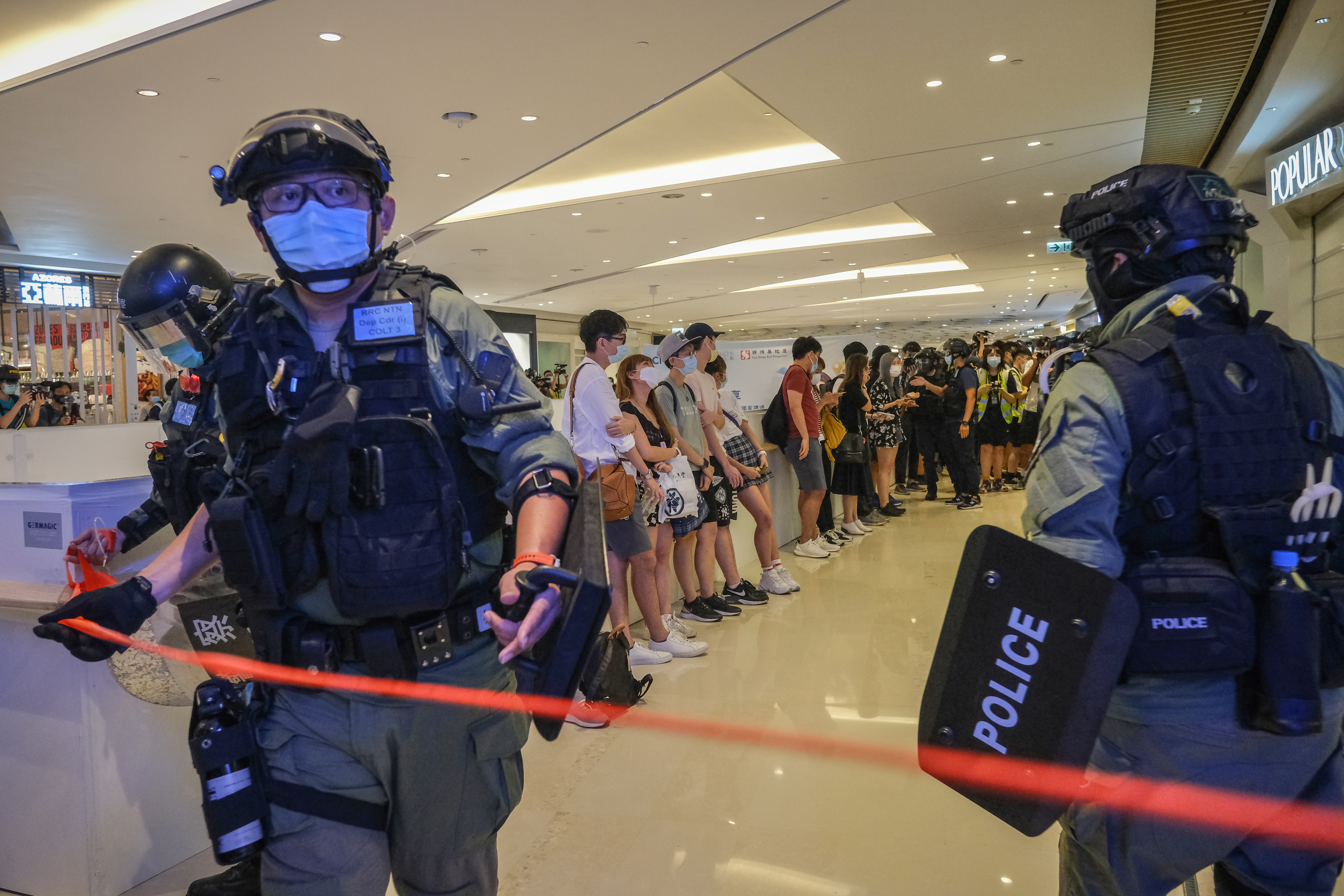
Police cordoned off Yoho Mall

In defiance of potential persecution under the national security law, hundreds of citizens gathered in Yuen Long’s YOHO mall and MTR exits to commemorate the one-year anniversary of the Yuen Long mob attack. In the attack, 45 train-riding commuters of all ages were beaten by white-shirt Yuen Long residents holding various sizes of sticks. Over 50 attackers have been identified by various channels such as RTHK and legislative council member Lam Cheuk-ting, who was also beaten by the mob last year, yet to this day only 7 of them were charged and none of those have been tried. On the 21st of each month after the attack MTR would purposely close off Yuen Long station, citing security risk. While the station remained largely open today many exits were closed. Whereas a year ago it allegedly took the police force 39 minutes to arrive at the crime scene after hundreds of 999 calls, today riot police in full gear came out in droves to enforce the social distance ordinance and disperse the crowd. Among those who protested were four individuals dressed in mob outfits, one of them carrying a watermelon, symbolizing the well-identified attacker Jacky Chan. Numerous people also held up blank pieces of paper, and many more chanted "no show on 721", implying the lack of police presence last year and the lack of investigation for a whole year. From around 5pm to midnight in YOHO mall and MTR area police stop-and-searched over 150 citizens, arrested 5 individuals for various charges and ticketed 96 people for breaking social distance ordinance (599G). There was several uses of pepper spray inside YOHO mall in addition to a point-blank close-range pepper-ball shooting at a man on the street, to which although the police denied hours after, the incident was captured by a car dashboard camera, refuting the denial. While Article 27 of Hong Kong Basic Law guarantees freedom of press, and 599G(4) exempt "Group gathering at a place of work for the purposes of work", at least 17 of the ticketed were journalists covering the story on site. Police later filed 6 complaints with Hong Kong Journalists Association (HKJA) against various web media and their journalists for untruthful and biased reporting, but HKJA slammed back by accusing the police for obstructing freedom of press, for targeting volunteer and (not salaried) student journalists, and for fining and imposing fear on journalists working at the scene.

==== International response: US Secretary of State met with Hong Kong pro-democracy activist Nathan Law ====
In a rather historic meeting with US Secretary of State Michael Pompeo in London, exiled Hong Kong pro-democracy activist Nathan Law discussed the looming threat of the pro-Beijing government's intervention in the upcoming September legislative election, for which over 600,000 Hong Kong citizens voted in the primaries two weeks ago. Law urged the world to keep an eye on this election as the government will use every excuse to disqualify candidates, delay the election, or suppress voter turnouts. There are two reasons that make this 20-minute meeting unique: first, the location of the meeting—the US ambassador's residence Winfield House at Regent's Park in London—traditionally only receives distinguished guests such as Queen Elizabeth and other royal family members. Law, as a 27-year-old exile, invited to hold meetings at Winfield House, with the US Secretary of State, is truly unusual. The second reason is the fact that both and former Hong Kong CEO CY Leung and current CEO Carrie Lam have not had the chance to meet with any US cabinet members. That the meeting with Law was arranged at the request of the State department, and that it took place right after Pompeo met with former HK governor Chris Patten, are evidence of Pompeo's support of the Hong Kong pro-democracy movement against China.

==== International response: Taiwan denied Hong Kong officials work visas ====
The Hong Kong Economic, Trade and Cultural Office (HKETCO) serves as an unofficial Hong Kong representative office in Taiwan since December 2011 that strives to promote economic, trade and cultural exchanges between Hong Kong and Taiwan. However, after Hong Kong government refused work visa to Taiwan TECO officials last week unless they sign a newly imposed "One China" declaration, this week HKETCO confirmed that at least two of the 13 staff have had their work visa denied and have returned to Hong Kong.

==== ProtonVPN donates to Hong Kong pro-democracy relief fund ====
While many businesses are now rethinking their Hong Kong strategy amid national security law, Swiss-based ProtonVPN has been adamant about Hong Kong's pro-democracy movement. ProtonVPN had issued a statement in May to support Hong Kong's digital freedom as national security law loomed. Today they announced their fundraising campaign to donate half of their July and August proceeds to support Hong Kong's pro-democracy organizations. In their declaration, Proton blamed Hong Kong's governing body effectively destroyed the idea of an autonomous, democratic Hong Kong by enacting a Beijing-backed security law, and as a result, "the Great Firewall of China can now be extended to Hong Kong, and protesters can now be arbitrarily detained and subject to criminal prosecution." Proton cited a 3000% surge of traffic since 6 July, the day the national security law's details were implemented.

=== 22 July ===
==== International response: United Kingdom's Hong Kong BNO path to UK citizenship details revealed ====
UK Home Secretary Priti Patel announced that starting 1 January 2021, Hong Kong citizens born before 1 July 1997, can apply for the British Nationals Overseas (BNO) passport and settle in the UK. Citizenship can be applied after staying for 5 years. UK Foreign Secretary Dominic Raab reiterated that "the UK is keeping its word: we will not look the other way on Hong Kong, and we will not duck our historic responsibilities to its people."

=== 23 July ===
==== Avast moves its VPN servers out of Hong Kong ====
Avast, a Czech-based online privacy company that offers Avast SecureLine VPN, AVG Secure VPN and HMA, will move their VPN servers from Hong Kong and their internet traffic will be rerouted via Taiwan and Singapore. The company will continue to monitor "for measures including the potential use of wiretaps and surveillance by the authorities" under the national security law, as it hopes to re-open for business in Hong Kong once the enforcement of the new law is fully evaluated.

==== International response: US Secretary of State gave China policy statement addressing Hong Kong's crisis ====
Amid heightened US-China diplomatic tensions, US Secretary of State Mike Pompeo gave a speech at Nixon Library on China strategies of the United States for the near future. In the speech, Pompeo gave a brief history and international expectations of the diplomatic relations between US and China, whose foundations were laid in the era of president Nixon almost 50 years ago. Pompeo said that, instead of hope, there was now "repression in Hong Kong and in Xinjiang". He further highlighted how in the past several months "Hong Kongers [have been] clamoring to emigrate abroad as the CCP tightens its grip on that proud city", and how the world has watched "this [new] China walk away from their promises to the world on Hong Kong...".

=== 27 July ===
==== International response: Japan may send cross-party observers to Hong Kong legislative election ====
A group of Japanese lawmakers are considering going to Hong Kong in September to oversee Hong Kong's legislative election process, fearing China's newly enacted national security law will infringe on Hong Kong's electoral independence and fairness. Group member former Defense Minister Gen Nakatani stated that the legislative election should "reflect the will of the people and must be held in a fair manner so that it can be recognized by the international society". Politician Shiori Yamao along with other members are also proposing various ways to aid Hong Kong pro-democracy protesters from China's tightening grip by ways such as relaxing visa requirements and refusing to "assist investigations of those suspected of violating the security law".

=== 28 July ===
==== International response: New Zealand suspends Hong Kong extradition treaty ====
New Zealand suspended its extradition treaty with Hong Kong and military and dual-use goods and technology exports from New Zealand to Hong Kong will now be treated in the same way as New Zealand treats such exports to China.

==== Pro-democracy tenured law professor fired by HKU ====
Benny Tai, a tenured associate professor of law at Hong Kong University, was convicted of public nuisance for his lead in the 2014 Hong Kong's pro-democracy umbrella movement. While on bail during appealing that decision, Tai helped organise Hong Kong's first ever pro-democratic legislative council election primaries in July with over 610,000 Hongkongers participating. The pro-government HKU Council voted 18–2 to fire Tai, thereby overturning a previous recommendation by the HKU Senate. Tai's lawyer expressed his discontent with the "disappointing political decision of the Council" and Tai stated in his Facebook page that he will appeal the decision and fight to protect academic freedom in Hong Kong University.

==== China oversteps into Hong Kong judiciary independence ====
Hong Kong's Department of Justice homepage states that under "the principle of 'One Country, Two Systems' which is enshrined in the Basic Law, Hong Kong enjoys independent judicial power including the power of final adjudication. It remains a common law jurisdiction within China." Article 85 of Hong Kong Basic Law states that the courts of the Hong Kong Special Administrative Region "shall exercise judicial power independently, free from any interference," and Article 82 of Basic Law requires that judges could be invited "from other common law jurisdictions" such as Australia, Canada, and the UK, to sit on the Court of Final Appeal. However, in today's press conference in Beijing, a mere 10 days after the UK Supreme Court president penned a statement expressing concerns over Hong Kong's judiciary independence after enacting the national security law, China's Foreign Ministry Spokesperson Wang Wenbin declared that China – not Hong Kong – has decided that "the Hong Kong SAR will suspend its agreements on surrendering fugitive offenders with Canada, Australia and the UK." In addition to ending Hong Kong's extradition agreements, China – not Hong Kong – has decided that the Hong Kong SAR "will suspend its agreements on mutual legal assistance in criminal matters with Canada, Australia and the UK."

=== 29 July ===
==== National security law: four student ex-members of a now-disbanded pro-democracy group arrested ====
The group, Studentlocalism, announced on 30 June late night that it had disbanded its Hong Kong division and launched it overseas, right before the national security law took effect on 1 July. At around 9pm police arrested four ex-members, aged 16 to 21 years, for allegedly participating in and inciting secession, reportedly based on the group's overseas branch essay on 25 July titled "Confronting Chinese Nationalism and Constructing Hong Kong Nationalism". Whereas Hong Kong Basic Law Article 27 guarantees Hong Kong citizens' freedom of speech, the national security law article 38 grants Hong Kong police and officers sweeping, albeit controversial, powers to investigate and arrest anyone – overseas and local alike – who expresses different opinions.

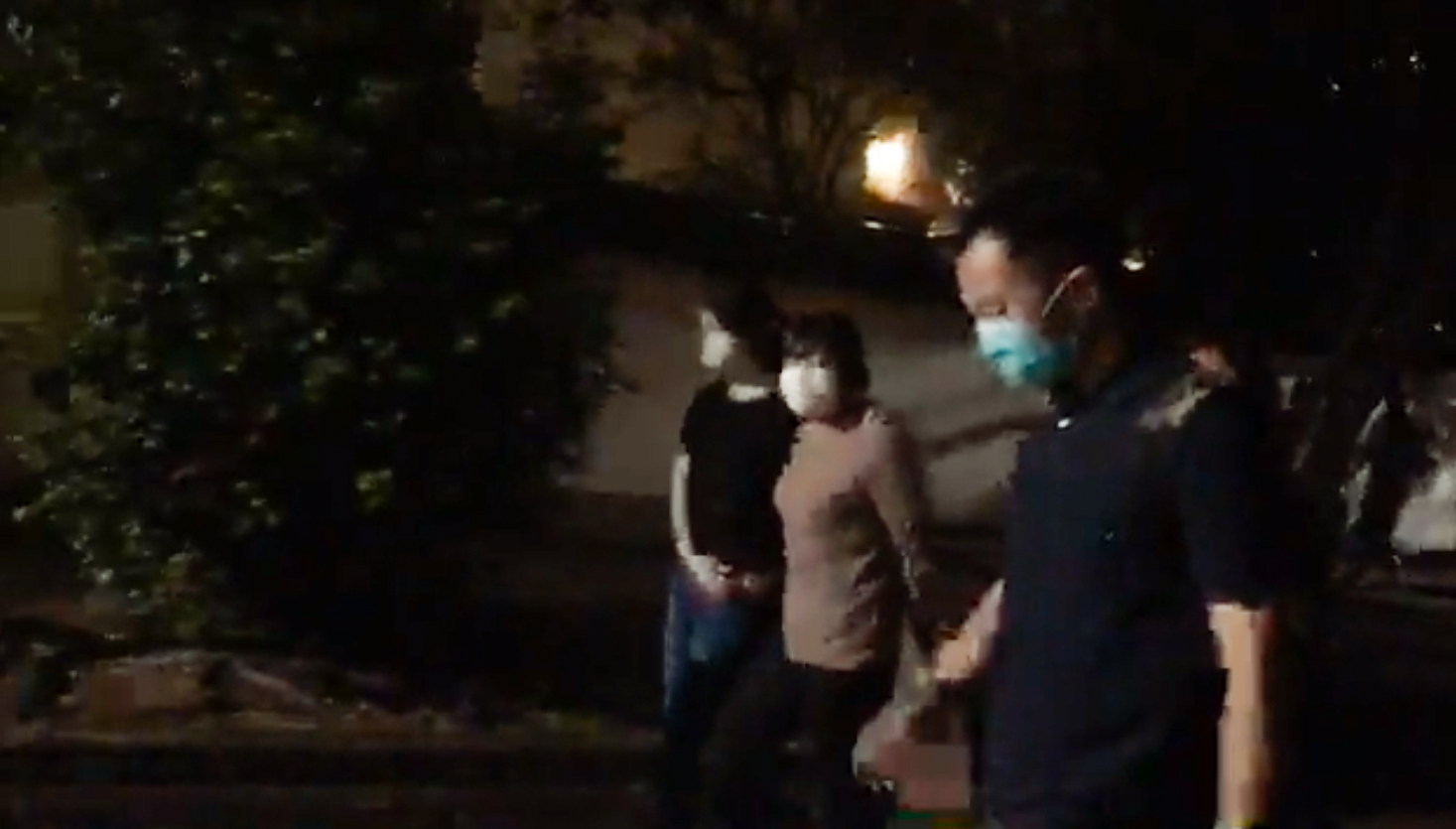
Studentlocalism former member Yanni Ho arrested in Tai Wai

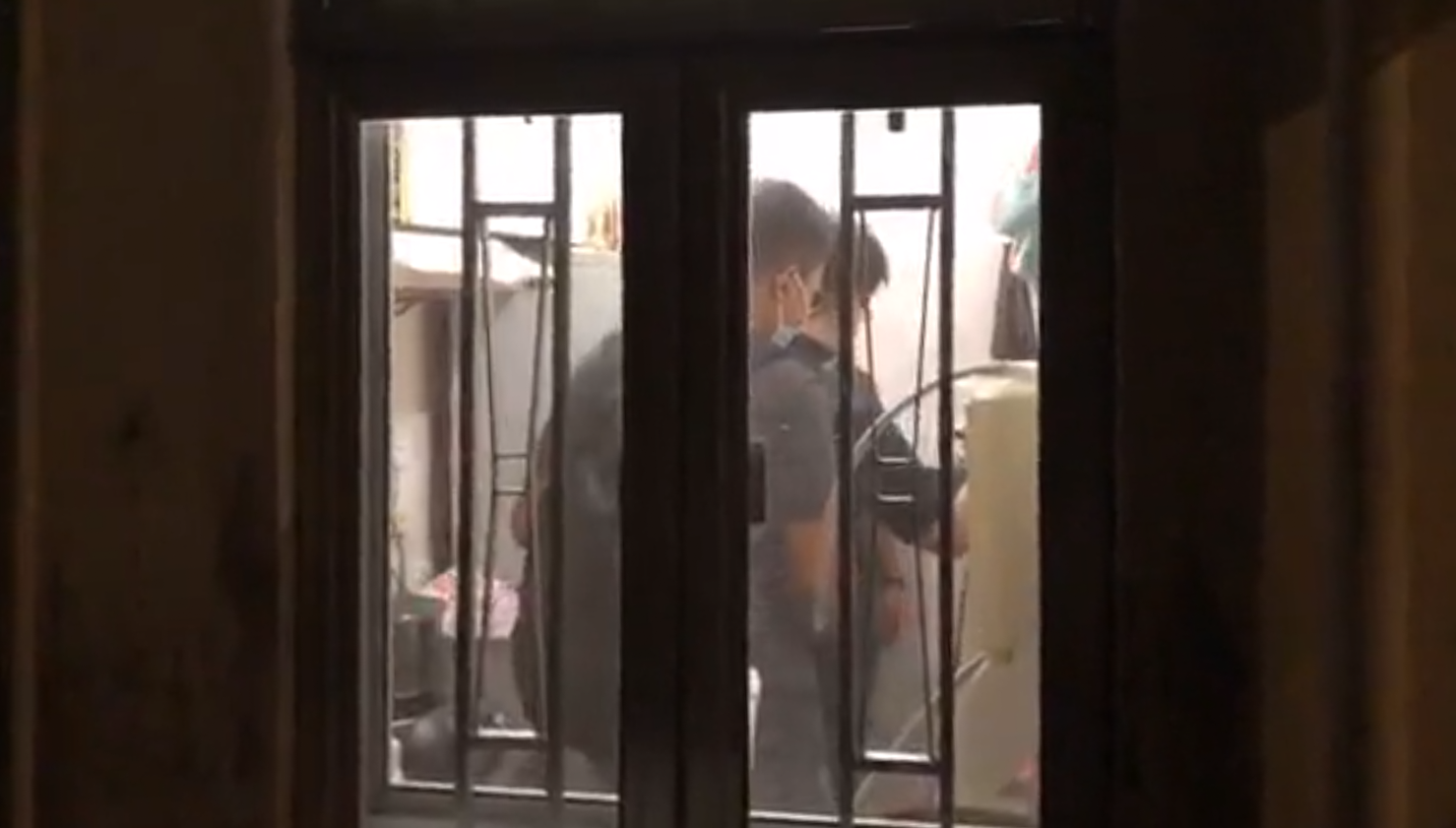
Police officers searched the Studentlocalism former member's apartment

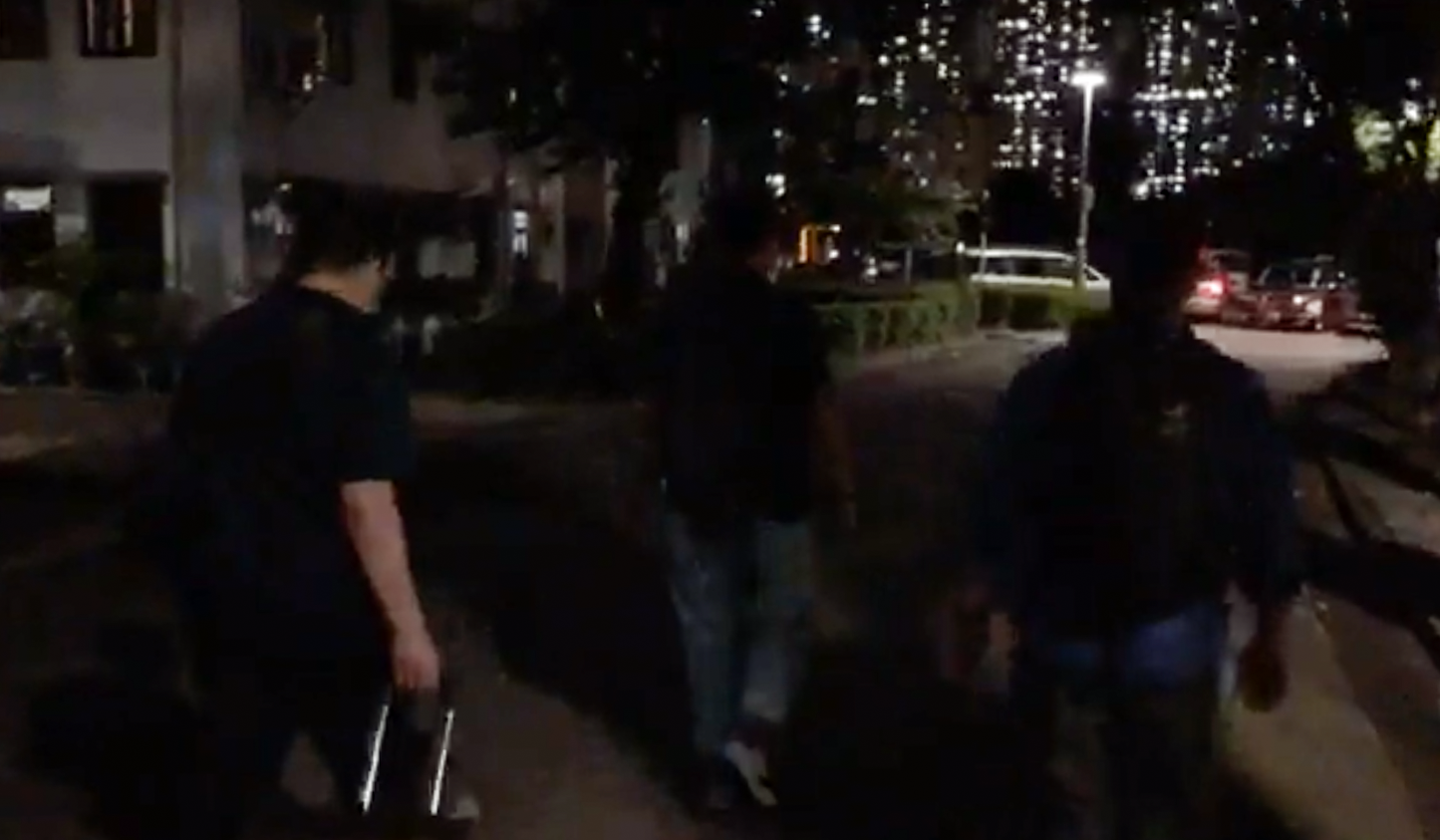
Plainclothes police officers take away items in Tai Wai New Village

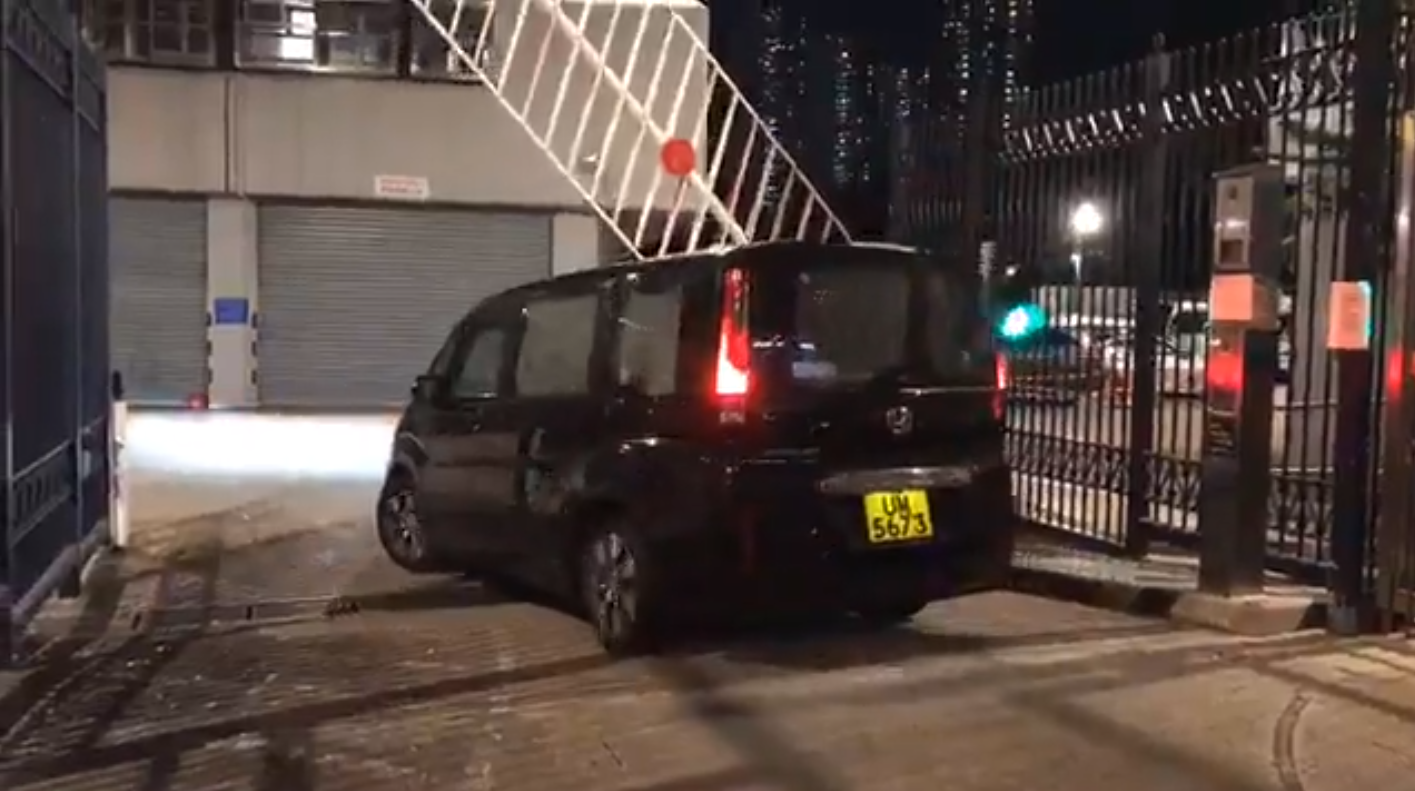
Police car carrying Yanni Ho arrived at Ma On Shan Police Station

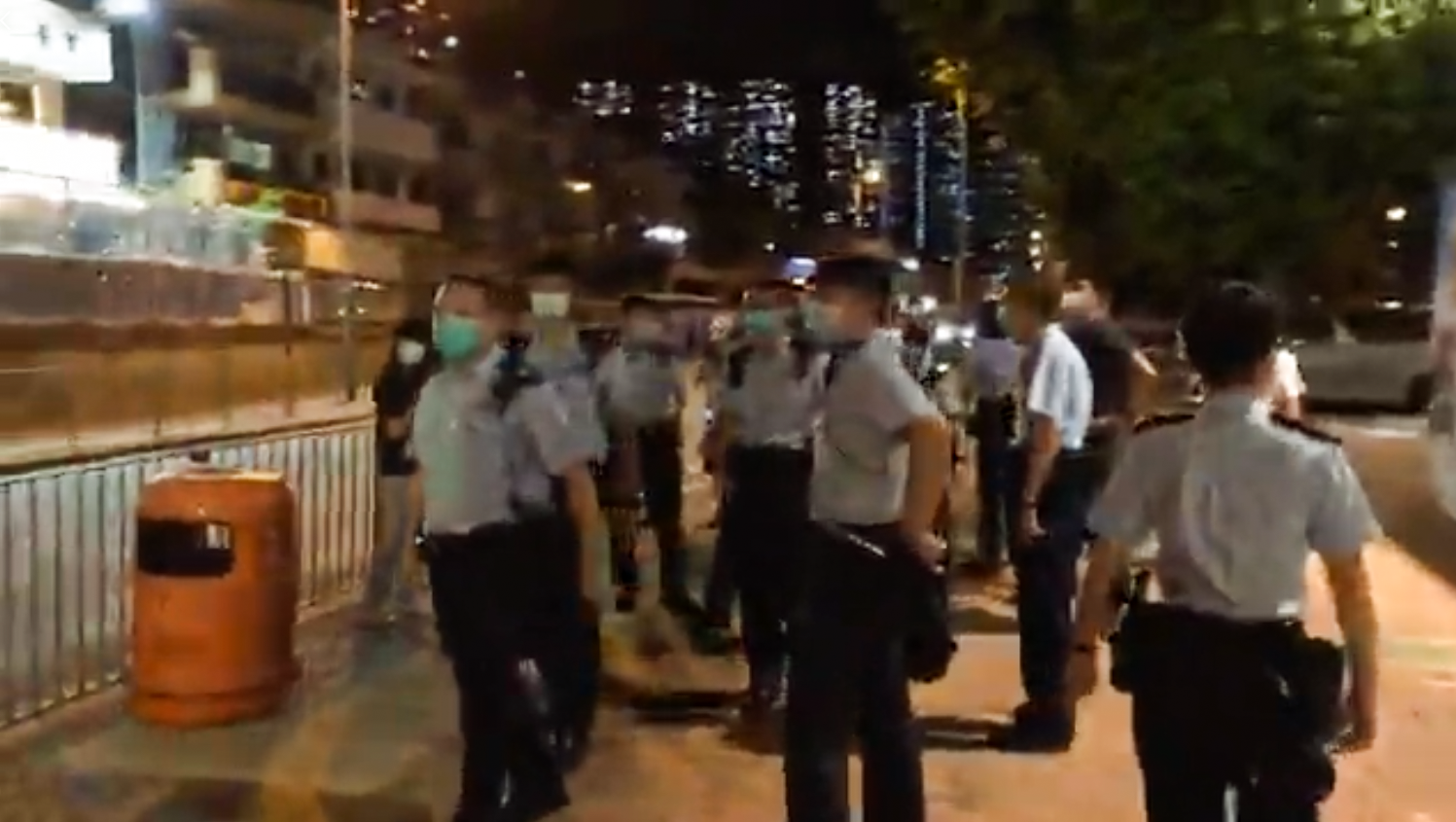
The large number of police officers on guard at the Tin Sum Police Station

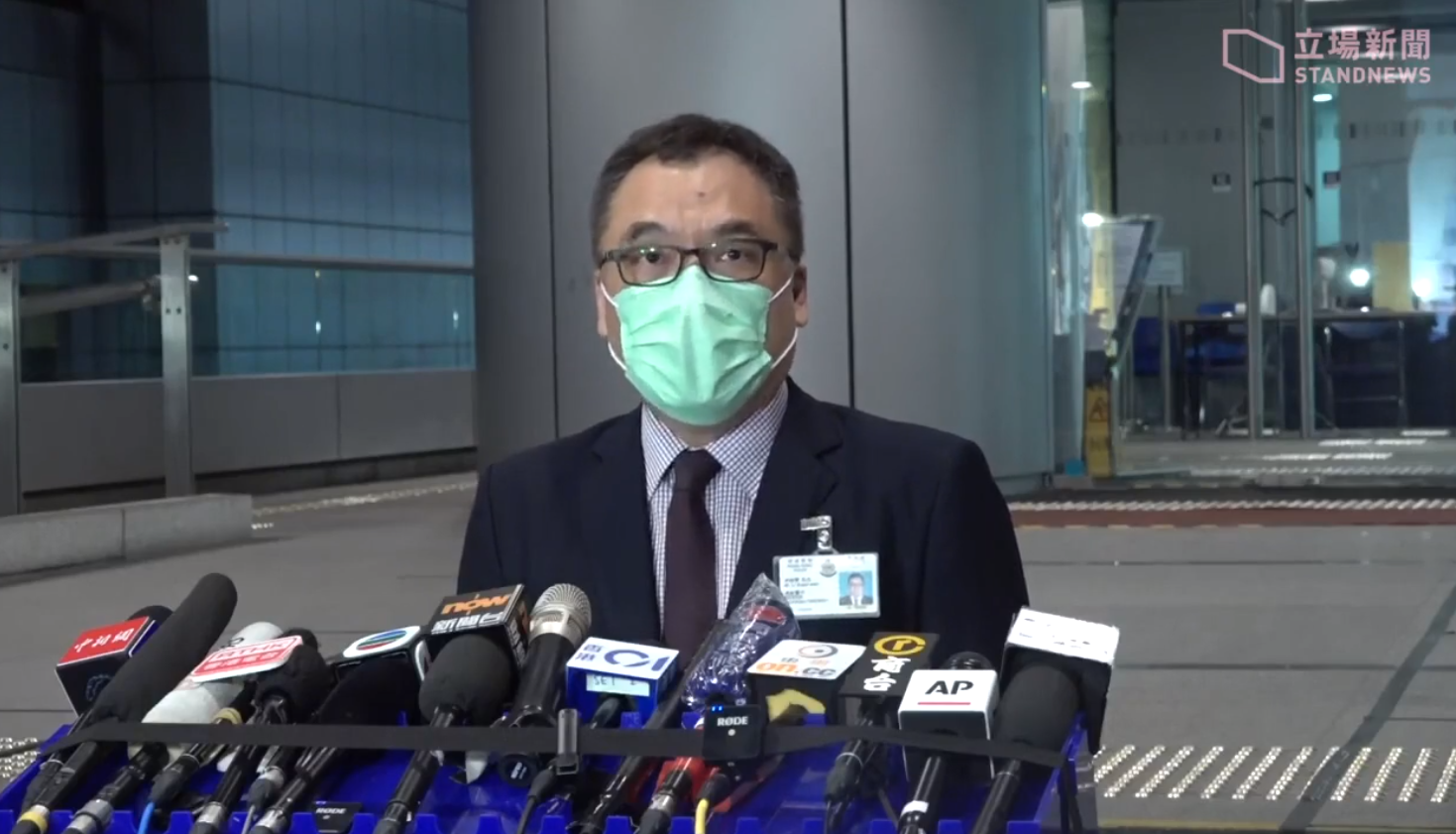
Senior Superintendent of the National Security Department of the Hong Kong Police Li Kwai-wah met with reporters at night

=== 30 July ===
==== International response: EU response package ====
EU concluded its month-long meeting on the Hong Kong agenda on 28 July, during which the Council expressed grave concerns regarding the Hong Kong national security law and set out five major action steps to be taken in the future to help Hong Kong defend its autonomy. Today EU published the detailed version. Some of the recommendations include suspending sensitive technologies and equipment sales, such as those used for civil suppression or cyber surveillance, to Hong Kong, increasing academic exchange with and scholarships to pro-democracy HK university programs, suspending new negotiations with Hong Kong, and closely monitoring pro-democracy activists' trials.

=== 31 July ===
==== Hong Kong disqualifies Opposition candidates ====
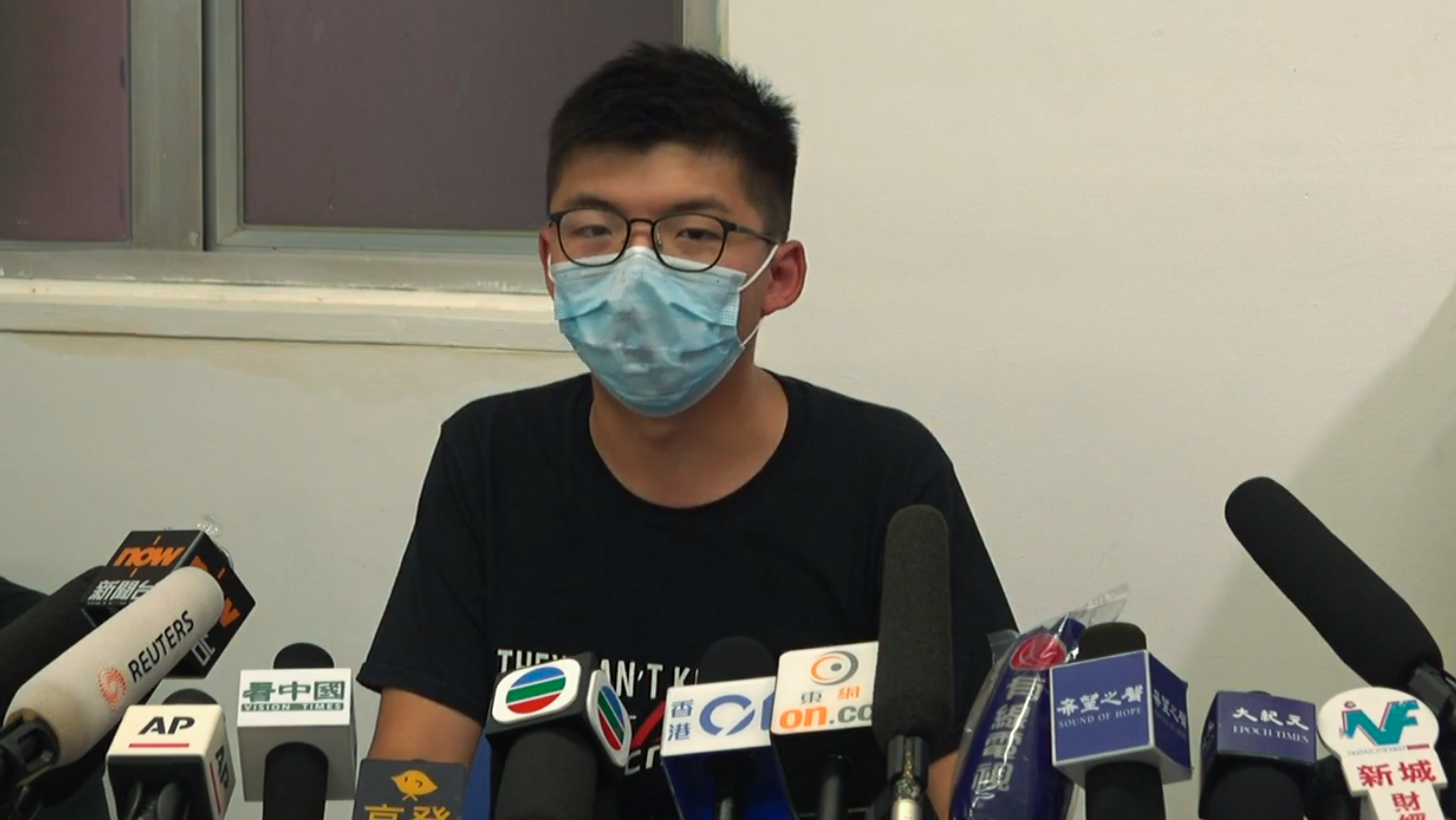
Joshua Wong speaks to the media after he and other candidates are disqualified on 30 July

Hong Kong authorities have disqualified 12 pro-democracy candidates from upcoming Legislative Council elections. Lester Shum, a candidate for the District Council (Second), told the media today that his nomination was declared invalid by the Returning Officer. In addition, four Civic Party candidates Dennis Kwok, Kwok Ka-ki, Alvin Yeung and Cheng Tat-hung were disqualified from running for the election. In addition, Tiffany Yuen, Fergus Leung and Alvin Cheng from Hong Kong Island, Ventus Lau and Gwyneth Ho from New Territories East, Joshua Wong from Kowloon East and Kenneth Leung from the accountancy constituency also said that they received a formal notification from the Returning Officer that their nomination was invalid.

Hong Kong government immediately issued a press release, expressing its approval and support for the Returning Officer's decision on the invalidity of the nomination of the 12 nominees. Hong Kong government stated for those supports democratic self-determination or support for Hong Kong independence as a future option to handle the Hong Kong system; seeks foreign governments or political organizations to interfere in the affairs of the SAR; in principle, opposes the National People's Congress Standing Committee's enactment of the Hong Kong national security law and included in Annex III of the Basic Law and promulgated and implemented in Hong Kong; stated that it intends to exercise the power of legislators to veto any government's legislative proposals, appointments, funding applications and budgets without discrimination after ensuring a majority in the Legislative Council. Those who force the government to accept certain political demands and refuse to recognize the People's Republic of China's sovereignty over the Hong Kong and the constitutional status of the Hong Kong as a local administrative region of the People's Republic of China are impossible to sincerely support the Basic Law, so it is impossible to perform the duties of a member of the Legislative Council.

==== Hong Kong postpones legislative council election by a year ====
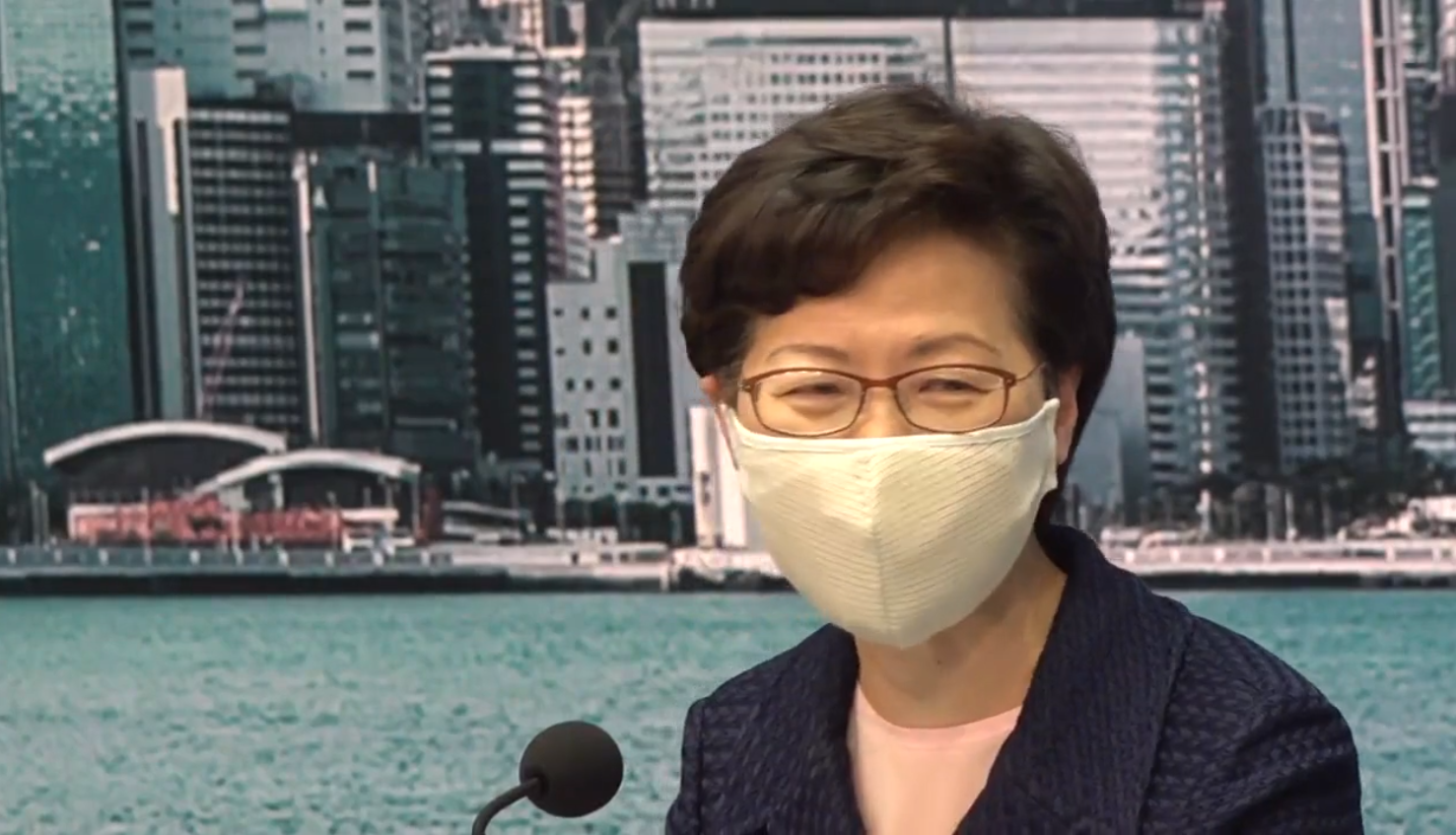
Chief Executive Carrie Lam took advantage of the severity of the epidemic and announced the use Emergency Regulation Ordinance to postpone the election of the Legislative Council on 5 September by one year until 6 September next year

Hong Kong has postponed the Legislative Council elections that had been scheduled for September by a year, citing public health concerns in view of the COVID-19 pandemic. In response the UK issued a statement urging Hong Kong and China to not use COVID-19 "as a pretext to further undermine the autonomy of Hong Kong." The United States also condemned the postponement, stating that "this action undermines the democratic processes and freedoms that have underpinned Hong Kong's prosperity." While Lam had used emergency powers to postpone the election, she said that these would not allow her to handle questions surrounding the four-year term limit stipulated in Article 69 of the Hong Kong Basic Law. On Lam's request to mainland authorities, on 11 August a unanimous decision to support an extension of incumbency was issued by the Standing Committee of the National People's Congress of mainland China.

==== Six pro-democracy Hong Kong overseas activists wanted ====
Hong Kong police has issued six arrest warrants to Hongkongers for allegedly "inciting secession and collusion with foreign forces." The six activists are Nathan Law (currently in England seeking asylum), Wayne Chan Ka-kui (currently in Amsterdam), Honcques Laus (currently in England seeking asylum), Samuel Chu (a US citizen), Simon Cheng (currently in England seeking asylum after being detained and allegedly tortured by China earlier), and Ray Wong (who had been granted asylum in Germany in 2018).

==== Germany suspends extradition treaty with Hong Kong over rights infringement ====
Germany suspended its extradition treaty with Hong Kong in response to Hong Kong government's disqualifying 12 opposition candidates, its legislative election postponement, and China's arrest warrants of Hong Kong overseas exiles using the controversial national security law.
