= Qiao Xiaoyang =

Chinese politician

- 乔晓阳

Chairman of the Hong Kong Basic Law Committee
- In office 2008–2013
- Succeeded by: Li Fei

Personal details
- Born: 1945 (age 80–81) Hubei, China
- Party: Chinese Communist Party
- Education: Beijing Language and Culture University
- Occupation: Politician

Qiao Xiaoyang (born 1945) is a Chinese politician who was the chairman of the Hong Kong Basic Law Committee from 2008 to 2013.

== Biography ==
Qiao was born in Hubei province in 1945. He was graduated from the Beijing Language and Culture University and joined the Chinese Communist Party (CCP) in 1974. He served as vice-chairman of the legislative affairs commission of the National People's Congress Standing Committee becoming 10th vice-chairman of the Law Committee in 2003.

He was also member of the Hong Kong SAR Preparatory Committee and Macao SAR Preparatory Committee oversaw the transfer of the sovereignty of the two former colonies.

== Chairman of HKSAR Basic Law Committee ==
He was appointed Chairman of the Hong Kong Basic Law Committee and Macao Basic Law Committee of the Standing Committee of the 11th National People's Congress. He served as chairman of the HKSAR Basic Law Committee until 2013.

He made a number of remarkable decisions and comments during his chairmanship of the Hong Kong Basic Law Committee.

In April 2010, Qiao said the reason the Standing Committee in 2007 ruled that Hong Kong "may" and not "must" have universal suffrage for the 2017 chief executive and 2020 Legislative Council elections was because any change in electoral methods required approval by local lawmakers. He added that passage of the reform package would "create excellent conditions for universal suffrage in the future." Instead of equal and universal right to vote, in June 2010 he further defined universal suffrage with the restriction of taking into consideration Hong Kong's legal status (as a non-independent state), being compatible with the executive-led political system, balancing the interests of different sectors of society, and being beneficial for the development of the city's capitalist economy. Pan-democrats said Qiao's statement reinforced their concerns, as it offered only the right to vote rather than to stand and nominate others in an election, and paved the way for keeping functional constituencies indefinitely.

On 24 March 2013, he stated that Chief Executive "candidates must be persons who love the country and love Hong Kong". He admitted that it would be difficult to define, but implied that the pan-democrats were unpatriotic, he said: "As long as they insist on confronting the central government, they cannot become the chief executive." He also mentioned in his speech that “the nominating committee is in fact an organisation. The nomination of CE candidates by the nominating committee is a form of organisational nomination, which could effectively screen out pro-democracy candidates when pro-Beijing camp have the majority in the nominating committee.
