= Shen Chunyao =

Chinese politician

- 沈春耀
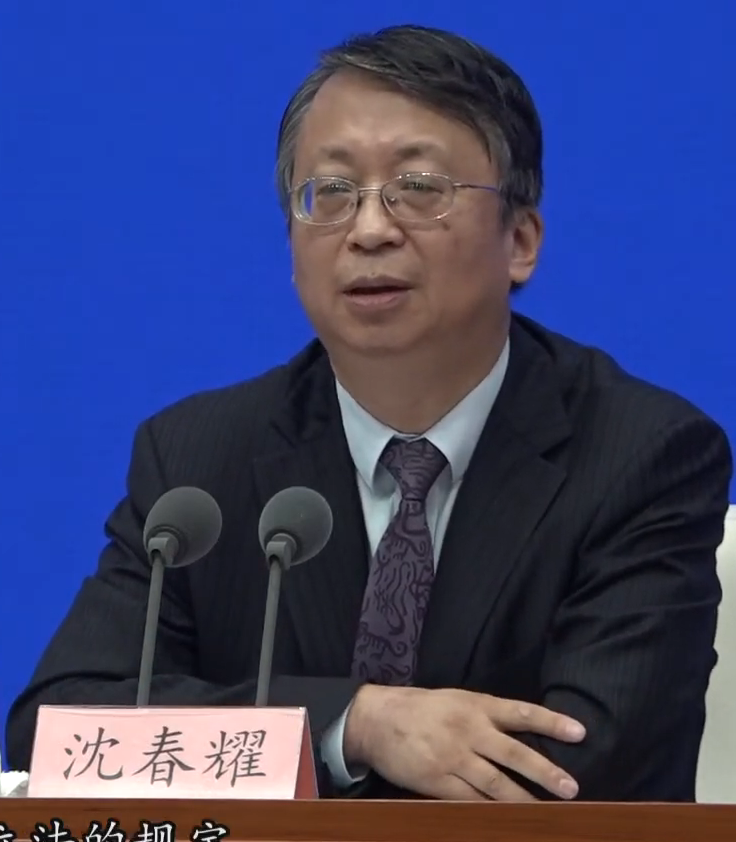
- Shen in July 2020

Chairperson of the Legislative Affairs Commission
- Incumbent
- Assumed office 27 April 2017
- Preceded by: Li Shishi

Personal details
- Born: May 1960 (age 66) Ye County, Shandong, China
- Party: Chinese Communist Party
- Education: Jilin University; China University of Political Science and Law

Shen Chunyao (Chinese: 沈春耀; pinyin: Shěn Chūnyào; born May 1960) is a Chinese politician who has been the chairperson of the Legislative Affairs Commission of the Standing Committee of the National People's Congress since April 2017.

He was a member of the Standing Committee of the 10th, 11th, 12th and 13th National People's Congress. He was an alternate of the 19th Central Committee of the Chinese Communist Party. He was a representative of the 20th National Congress of the Chinese Communist Party.

== Biography ==
Shen was born in Ye County (now Laizhou), Shandong, in May 1960, and graduated from Jilin University and then the Department of Law, China University of Political Science and Law.

Shen worked in the State Council before being assigned to the National People's Congress. He was a member of the National People's Congress Financial and Economic Affairs Committee in March 2003 and subsequently a member of the National People's Congress Legal Committee in October 2004. He also served as deputy chairperson of the Legislative Affairs Committee of the Standing Committee of the National People's Congress from April 2007 to December 2008 and director of the Research Office of the General Office of the Standing Committee of the National People's Congress from December 2008 to April 2011. He was promoted to deputy secretary-general of the Standing Committee of the National People's Congress. in April 2011. On 27 April 2017, he was promoted again to become chairperson of the Legislative Affairs Commission. He concurrently serves as director of the Hong Kong Basic Law Committee and director of the Macao Basic Law Committee since March 2018.

Assembly seats
Preceded by Li Shishi	Chairperson of the Legislative Affairs Commission; 2017–	Incumbent
