= Li Shishi (politician) =

Chinese politician

Li Shishi (Chinese: 李适时; pinyin: Lǐ Shìshí; born July 1953) is a Chinese politician.

== Biography ==
Li was born in Changsha, Hunan in 1953. He graduated from English Department of Hunan Normal University in 1977, and admitted to China Foreign Affairs University, pursuing a master's degree from 1981 to 1984.

He was appointed to be the Chairman of the Legislative Affairs Commission of the Standing Committee of the National People's Congress in 2008.

Li is a member of the 18th Central Commission for Discipline Inspection.
