= Macao Basic Law Committee =

Organization of the NPCSC

Macao Special Administrative Region Basic Law Committee of the Standing Committee of the National People's Congress
- 全国人民代表大会常务委员会 澳门特别行政区基本法委员会
- Formation: December 20, 1999
- Type: Working committee of the Standing Committee of the National People's Congress
- Location: Office Building of the NPC, No.1 Qianmen West Street, Xicheng District, Beijing
- Director: Shen Chunyao
- Deputy Directors: Chui Sai Cheong, Zhang Yong
- Parent organization: Standing Committee of the National People's Congress

Macao Basic Law Committee
- Simplified Chinese: 全国人民代表大会常务委员会澳门特别行政区基本法委员会
- Traditional Chinese: 全國人民代表大會常務委員會澳門特別行政區基本法委員會
Transcriptions
Standard Mandarin
- Hanyu Pinyin: Quánguó Rénmín Dàibiǎo Dàhuì Chángwù Wěiyuánhuì Àomén Tèbié Xíngzhèngqū Jīběnfǎ Wěiyuánhuì

Abbreviation
- Simplified Chinese: 澳门基本法委员会
- Traditional Chinese: 澳門基本法委員會
Transcriptions
Standard Mandarin
- Hanyu Pinyin: Àomén Jīběnfǎ Wěiyuánhuì

The Macao Special Administrative Region Basic Law Committee of the Standing Committee of the National People's Congress is a commission of the Standing Committee of the National People's Congress (NPCSC), the permanent body of China's top legislature. Established in 1999, it advises the NPCSC regarding the Macao Basic Law.

== History ==
The Macao Basic Law Committee was established by the 13th session of the Standing Committee of the 9th National People's Congress on 20 December 1990.

== Functions ==
The Committee is a working committee of the NPCSC. It is responsible for studying issues concerning the implementation of Articles 17, 18, 143 and 144 of the Macao Basic Law and to provide opinions to the NPC Standing Committee. It also holds a number of informal meetings to exchange views regarding the implementation of the Macao Basic Law.

== Structure ==
The Macao Basic Law Committee is composed of 10 members: 5 from mainland China and 5 from Macau, with a term of office of 5 years. All members are appointed by the NPC Standing Committee. Macau members are jointly nominated by the Chief Executive of Macau, the President of the Legislative Assembly and the President of the Court of Final Appeal. The committee has the following offices:

1. Office
2. Research Office
