= Legislative Affairs Commission =

Organization of the NPCSC

Legislative Affairs Commission of the Standing Committee of the National People's Congress
- 全国人民代表大会常务委员会 法制工作委员会
- Formation: February 23, 1979
- Type: Working committee of the Standing Committee of the National People's Congress
- Location: Office Building of the NPC, No.1 Qianmen West Street, Xicheng District, Beijing
- Director: Shen Chunyao
- Deputy Directors: Zhang Yong, Wu Zeng, Wang Ruihe, Sun Zhenping
- Parent organization: Standing Committee of the National People's Congress

Legislative Affairs Commission
- Simplified Chinese: 全国人民代表大会常务委员会法制工作委员会
- Traditional Chinese: 全國人民代表大會常務委員會法制工作委員會
Transcriptions
Standard Mandarin
- Hanyu Pinyin: Quánguó Rénmín Dàibiǎo Dàhuì Chángwù Wěiyuánhuì Fǎzhì Gōngzuò Wěiyuánhuì

Abbreviation
- Simplified Chinese: 全国人大常委会法制工作委员会
- Traditional Chinese: 全國人大常委會法制工作委員會
Transcriptions
Standard Mandarin
- Hanyu Pinyin: Quánguó Réndà Chángwěihuì Fǎzhì Gōngzuò Wěiyuánhuì

Shortest abbreviation
- Simplified Chinese: 全国人大常委会法工委
- Traditional Chinese: 全國人大常委會法工委
Transcriptions
Standard Mandarin
- Hanyu Pinyin: Quánguó Réndà Chángwěihuì Fǎgōngwěi

The Legislative Affairs Commission of the Standing Committee of the National People's Congress is a working organ of the Standing Committee of the National People's Congress (NPCSC), the permanent organ of the NPC.

The Legislative Affairs Commission was first established in 1979 to assist in rebuilding China's legal system after the Cultural Revolution, and assumed its current form in 1983. The LAC has wide-ranging responsibilities, including drafting the NPCSC's annual and five-year legislative plans, drafting legislative bills, and gathering opinions on draft bills.

== History ==
In February 1979, the NPCSC established a Legal Affairs Commission to assist in rebuilding China's legal system after the Cultural Revolution. Headed by Peng Zhen, it consisted of 80 legal officials, and was given autonomy by the Chinese Communist Party (CCP) to draft laws. In what was termed as a "miracle", the commission drafted and submitted seven bills in three months.

The NPC Organic Law, passed in 1982, gave the NPCSC the authority to establish a working organ if necessary. In September 1983, the NPCSC exercised that power, and renamed the commission to become the Legislative Affairs Commission.

== Functions ==
China News Service interview with LAC spokesperson Zang Tiewei on issues related to the Civil Code

The Legislative Affairs Commission is a ministerial-level body of the NPCSC dedicated to assist it in legislation-related functions. The LAC is responsible for drafting NPCSC's five-year and annual legislative plans, subject to approval by the NPCSC's Council of Chairpersons and the CCP leadership. To draft the plans, it solicits views from a wide range of groups, including the central government, local people's congresses, NPC delegates, experts, trade associations, and online public opinion. The Commission's role in formulating the nation's legislative agenda has given it a key role, especially since the NPCSC typically meets only twice a month, meaning the Commission influences which legislative bills are presented at sessions.

=== Drafting laws ===
The Commission also drafts bills, which are then submitted to the NPCSC through the Council of Chairpersons, as the LAC cannot submit bills directly itself. In practice, the LAC effectively drafts nearly all the bills the Council submits.

Though only the NPC Constitution and Law Committee directly submit amendments to a bill for discussion or a vote after conducting "unified deliberations" by considering opinions of various sides, it has delegated much of its day-to-day work to the LAC as it has a much smaller amount of staff than the Commission. Through seminars, debate sessions, and public hearings, the LAC gathers opinions on the draft laws from various parties, including delegates to the NPC, local people's congresses, various government agencies and experts. It also collects and organises the opinions and views of NPCSC members expressed during deliberations.

The LAC distributes these materials to NPC special committees, especially the Constitution and Law Committee, or to the NPCSC sessions if necessary. Based on the solicited opinions, it has the authority to propose amendments to the draft laws. According to law professor Chu Chenge, through its control over the information process, the Commission can "filter out views with which the leadership of the NPCSC disagrees", thereby "making it easier to impose the will of the leaders of the NPCSC or the Legislative Affairs Commission on legislators".

Before enacting draft laws, it conducts an assessment of them, including the feasibility of major statutory schemes, the timing of their promulgation, their social effects, and any potential problems. It also standardises the draft law's language and makes cosmetic changes before it is put to a final vote.

=== After passage of laws ===
The Commission has, in practice, the sole responsibility for conducting "recording and review" processes, an oversight tool of the NPCSC to review and rein in unwanted legislation. The process first involves various rulemaking bodies "recording" the legislation enactments with the NPCSC, which then "reviews" their validity.

The LAC has the authority to respond to "legal inquiries regarding specific questions", meaning requests by provincial people's congresses and central government bodies clarifying where the laws are applicable in real-life scenarios. Though it has been responding to such inquiries since the 1980s, most of the responses have not been made public. The Commission's responses have been compared to the NPCSC's legislative or constitutional interpretations. However, according to the NPC Observer, scholarly consensus holds that, unlike the NPCSC's interpretations, the Commission's responses do not have the force of law.

=== Other ===
The Commission's Constitution Office was established in 2018 to support the NPC Constitution and Law Committee in its work related to constitutional enforcement. It has also established a spokesperson's office at its Research Office in 2019 in order to increase transparency. The spokesperson holds a press conference before each NPCSC session, introducing the session's legislative agenda and providing a brief summary of the comments received on the pending bills during public consultation. The spokespersons have also issued public statements to express the NPCSC's views on various issues.

== Structure ==
At its establishment, the commission had three subdivisions: the Law Office, the Policy Research Office, and the Administrative Office. It currently has 11 offices:

1. Criminal Law Office (established 1983)
2. Economic Law Office (1983)
3. Civil Law Office (1987)
4. State Law Office (2004)
5. Administrative Law Office (2004)
6. Social Law Office (2011)
7. Constitution Office (2018)
8. Administrative Office (1979)
9. Research Office (1983)
10. Recording and Reviewing Regulations Office (2004)
11. Legislative Planning Office (2007)
12. Constitution Office (2018)

While no official tally exists on the number of personnel employed at the commission, a 2008 report put the number at 170. NPC Observer interviews with three members of the LAC in 2014 and 2020 revealed the number to be above 200. Most of its members are considered to have high legal training, and most of its positions require a degree in law, often at the graduate level.
