= Hong Kong Basic Law Committee =

Organization of the NPCSC

Hong Kong Special Administrative Region Basic Law Committee of the Standing Committee of the National People's Congress
- 全国人民代表大会常务委员会 香港特别行政区基本法委员会
- Formation: July 1, 1997
- Type: Working committee of the Standing Committee of the National People's Congress
- Location: Office Building of the NPC, No.1 Qianmen West Street, Xicheng District, Beijing
- Director: Shen Chunyao
- Deputy Directors: Wong Yuk-shan, Zhang Yong
- Parent organization: Standing Committee of the National People's Congress

Hong Kong Basic Law Committee
- Simplified Chinese: 全国人民代表大会常务委员会香港特别行政区基本法委员会
- Traditional Chinese: 全國人民代表大會常務委員會香港特別行政區基本法委員會
Transcriptions
Standard Mandarin
- Hanyu Pinyin: Quánguó Rénmín Dàibiǎo Dàhuì Chángwù Wěiyuánhuì Xiānggǎng Tèbié Xíngzhèngqū Jīběnfǎ Wěiyuánhuì

Abbreviation
- Simplified Chinese: 香港基本法委员会
- Traditional Chinese: 香港基本法委員會
Transcriptions
Standard Mandarin
- Hanyu Pinyin: Xiānggǎng Jīběnfǎ Wěiyuánhuì

The Hong Kong Special Administrative Region Basic Law Committee of the Standing Committee of the National People's Congress is a commission of the Standing Committee of the National People's Congress (NPCSC), the permanent body of China's top legislature. Established in 1997, it advises the NPCSC regarding the Hong Kong Basic Law.

== History ==
The Hong Kong Basic Law Committee was established by the 26th session of the Standing Committee of the 8th National People's Congress on 1 July 1997.

== Functions ==
The committee is a working committee of the NPCSC. It is responsible for studying issues concerning the implementation of Articles 17, 18, 158 and 159 of the Hong Kong Basic Law and to provide opinions to the NPC Standing Committee.

== Structure ==
The Hong Kong Basic Law Committee is composed of 12 members; six from mainland China and six from Hong Kong, with a term of office of five years. All members are appointed by the NPC Standing Committee. Hong Kong members are jointly nominated by the Chief Executive of Hong Kong, the President of the Legislative Council and the Chief Justice of the Court of Final Appeal. The committee has the following offices:

1. Office
2. Research Office
