= Timeline of the 2019–2020 Hong Kong protests (August 2020) =

August events of the 2019–2020 pro-democracy demonstrations in Hong Kong

Timeline of the 2019–2020 Hong Kong protests
2019			March–June				July	August	September	October	November	December
2020	January	February	March	April	May	June	July	August	September	October	November	December
2021	January	February	March	April	May	June	July	August	September–November			December

The month of August 2020 in the 2019–2020 Hong Kong protests saw only sparse and relatively small protests, mainly due to the city going through a third wave of the COVID-19 pandemic and an outdoor gathering ban on groups of more than two people. As the impact of the Hong Kong National Security Law on the city became increasingly evident, and additionally in response to acts by representatives of the local and mainland governments throughout the protests, Western democracies continued to voice sharp criticism and implemented sanctions against China, with the United States imposing sanctions on 11 Hong Kong officials on 7 August. These developments supported the opinion expressed by former British Foreign Secretary Malcolm Rifkind in late June that the protests had morphed from a mostly local dispute into an international one.

The arrest of Apple Daily proprietor Jimmy Lai on 10 August was seen by representatives of Western democracies and many observers as a violation of journalistic freedom. The arrest of pro-democracy politician and activist Agnes Chow on the same day fueled concerns that the National Security Law would, contrary to its Article 39, be applied retroactively. Concerns about opaque mainland laws taking precedence over Hong Kong's traditional legal procedures rose further after the mainland Chinese coastguard foiled an attempted escape of twelve people, including several activists, to Taiwan on 23 August. The twelve were detained across the Hong Kong border in Shenzhen, with no substantial further information about them transpiring well into September.

== Events ==
=== 1 August ===
==== Solidarity protest in Toronto ====
A group of various Asian-Canadians gathered in front of Toronto's China embassy on Saturday to voice their concern of China's growing oppression in the region. Indian-Canadians protested Chinese invasion of Galwan Valley, Iranian-Canadians objected the recent talk of a potential "25-year land sale deal" the Iranian government plans to sell to China, Tibetan-Canadians denounced the decade-long invasion into the Tibetan Plateau, and Hong Kong-Canadians denounced the Hong Kong national security law and China's violation of Hong Kong's autonomy. The protesters demanded strong reactions from the Canadian government, and encouraged all Canadians to boycott Chinese-made products.

=== 2 August ===
==== International response: Switzerland ====
Switzerland's foreign minister Ignazio Cassis noted in a local newspaper interview that human rights violations are on the rise in China, and that China's recent policies on Hong Kong would affect many Swiss companies that have long invested in Hong Kong. He stated that Switzerland "must defend its interests and values more robustly, for example by strengthening international law and the multilateral system" if China were to continue its current path. Spokesperson for the Chinese Foreign Ministry Wang Wenbin later denounced Cassis' statement as baseless accusation and meddling in China's internal affairs.

==== Solidarity protest in New York ====
Hosted by the pro-Hong Kong group New Yorkers Supporting Hong Kong (NY4HK), around 50 people could be seen waving flags, singing, and chanting in Times Square for a protest, with organizers saying that over 50 more protesters were on the sidelines as they had not wanted to be photographed.

=== 3 August ===
==== International response: France ====
France halted ratifying its extradition agreement with Hong Kong. The agreement was signed in May 2017 but it was never ratified.

=== 4 August ===
==== UK Parliamentary group found Hong Kong Police in violation of international humanitarian law ====
The parliamentary organization, All-Party Parliamentary Group on Hong Kong (APPG), published the results from its five-month long investigation into claims that the Hong Kong Police Force consistently violated humanitarian principles and human rights laws during the year-long Hong Kong Anti-extradition Protest since 2019. Medical workers, as protected by the Geneva Convention, "shall be respected and protected" in war and civil unrests, and "in no circumstances shall any person be punished for having carried out medical activities". The 80-page report, titled The Shrinking Safe Space for Humanitarian Aid Workers in Hong Kong, found no evidence to justify "stripping [first aiders] of the protections otherwise available to humanitarian aid workers", concluding with strong statements denouncing Hong Kong Police Force's treatment of first-aiders. The group urged the UK to urgently "impose Magnitsky-style sanctions on those responsible for permitting the excessive police violence at high level in the administration, including but not limited to Chief Executive Carrie Lam and the Commissioner of Police."

=== 6 August ===
United Nations' Human Rights Committee listed a 27-point clarification request to the Hong Kong government over possible human rights abuse. The document, titled "List of issues in relation to the fourth periodic report of Hong Kong, China" raises questions and concerns over the legitimacy, procedural details, and compatibility of the new national security law with the Hong Kong Basic Law, the disqualification of legislative council election candidates, domestic abuse, gender-based violence, right to life and prohibition of torture, treatments to migrants, refugees, and asylum seekers, fairness and access to independence of judiciary and trial, right to privacy, freedom of expression, rights to peaceful assembly, freedom of association, and freedom to participation in public affairs.

=== 7 August ===
==== US imposes sanctions on 11 Hong Kong officials ====
The US imposed sanctions on 11 Hong Kong officials for actions and involvements "undermining Hong Kong's autonomy and restricting the freedom of expression or assembly of the citizens of Hong Kong" during the year-long Hong Kong pro-democracy protests. The 11 individuals are: Carrie Lam, chief executive officer of Hong Kong, Chris Tang, Commissioner of Hong Kong Police Force (HKPF); Stephen Lo, Former Commissioner of HKPF, John Lee Ka-chiu, HKSAR Secretary for Security, Teresa Cheng, HKSAR Secretary for Justice, Erick Tsang, HKSAR Secretary for Constitutional and Mainland Affairs, Xia Baolong, Director of the Hong Kong and Macao Affairs Office of the State Council, Zhang Xiaoming, deputy director of the Hong Kong and Macao Affairs Office of the State Council, Luo Huining, Director of the Hong Kong Liaison Office, Zheng Yanxiong, Director, Office for Safeguarding National Security in Hong Kong, and Eric Chan, Secretary General, Committee for Safeguarding National Security of the HKSAR. Under the sanctions, companies and banks are not to make "contribution or provision of funds, goods, or services by, to, or for the benefit of any blocked person or the receipt of any contribution or provision of funds, goods or services from any such person."

=== 9 August ===
==== International response: Five countries urge reinstatement of candidates, hastened elections ====
In a joint statement by the United Kingdom, Australia, Canada, New Zealand and the United States, the Hong Kong government was urged to reinstate the eligibility of disqualified candidates and to hold elections for the Legislative Council at the earliest, thus reversing the previous postponement by a year to September 2021.

=== 10 August ===
==== Police arrest Jimmy Lai, raid Apple Daily newsroom ====
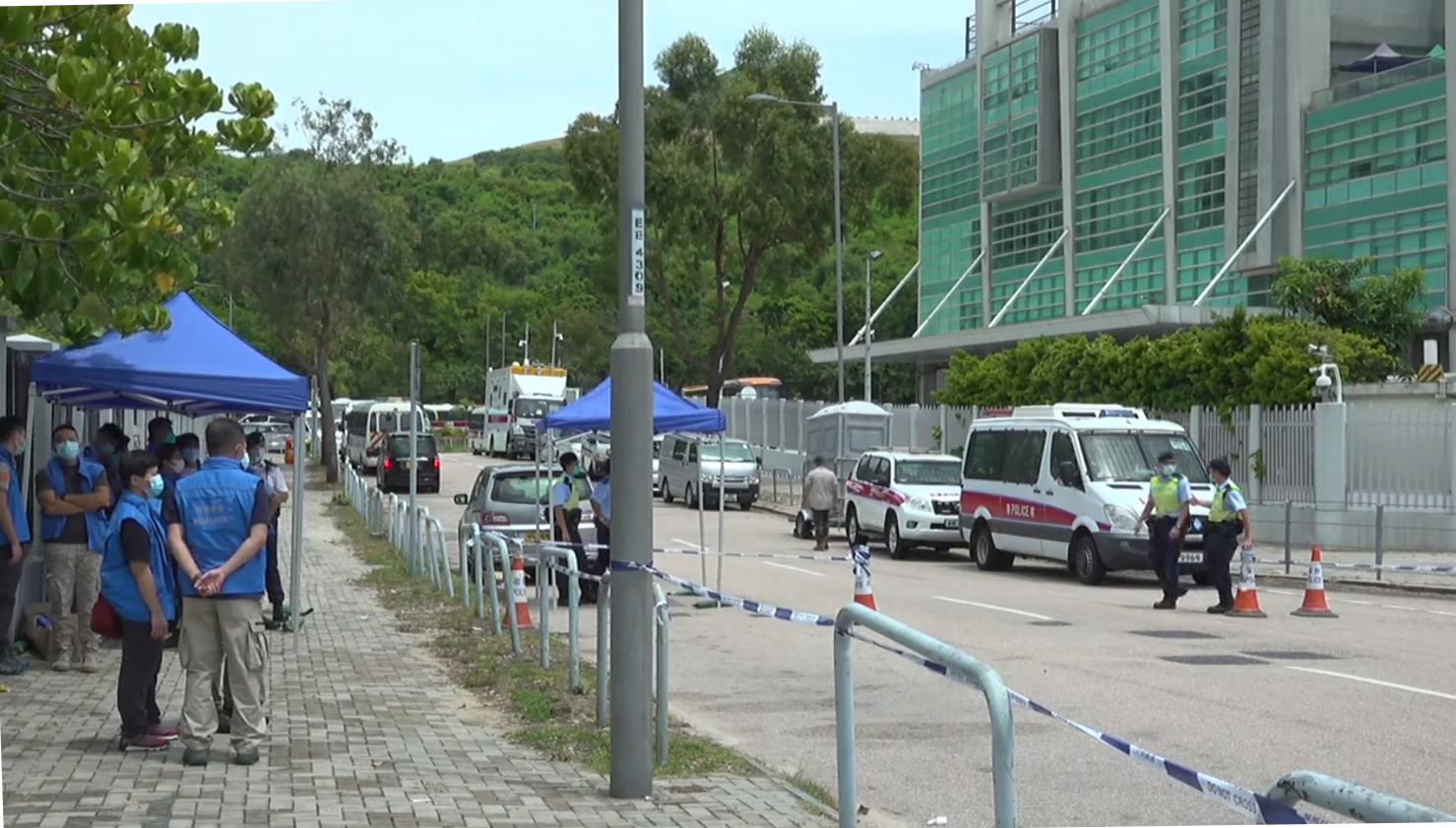
Police waiting outside the office of Apple Daily

Jimmy Lai, founder of Next Digital and owner of the only pro-democracy print newspaper in Hong Kong, Apple Daily, was arrested at his home on August 10 under the new national security law for alleged collusion with foreign forces. He was later taken to Next Digital's headquarter by approximately 200 police members as they raided the newspaper office for hours. Several computers and digital devices were confiscated. His newspaper, Apple Daily, live-streamed the entire raid on their social media platform. In response to this arrest, pro-democracy supporters "rallied" Next Digital's stock for over 300% at some point during the day, and ended the trading day with over 180% increase. The day after the arrest, more than 500,000 copies were printed – the normal volume being 100,000 copies –, and citizens began to queue as early as 2:00 a.m. to buy these.

==== Police raids Nikkei office ====
On 29 August, AFP reported that three police officers came to the Hong Kong office of Nihon Keizai Shimbun with court orders to investigate. It was related to the advertisement published by Demosistō one year ago calling on the international community to support the anti-extradition bill protests. It was suspected for 'dealing with property known or believed to represent of an indictable offences', and did not involve national security law. The source said that the police did not take away anything that day, and the Nikkei submitted the relevant documents two weeks later.

==== Further arrests under the national security law ====
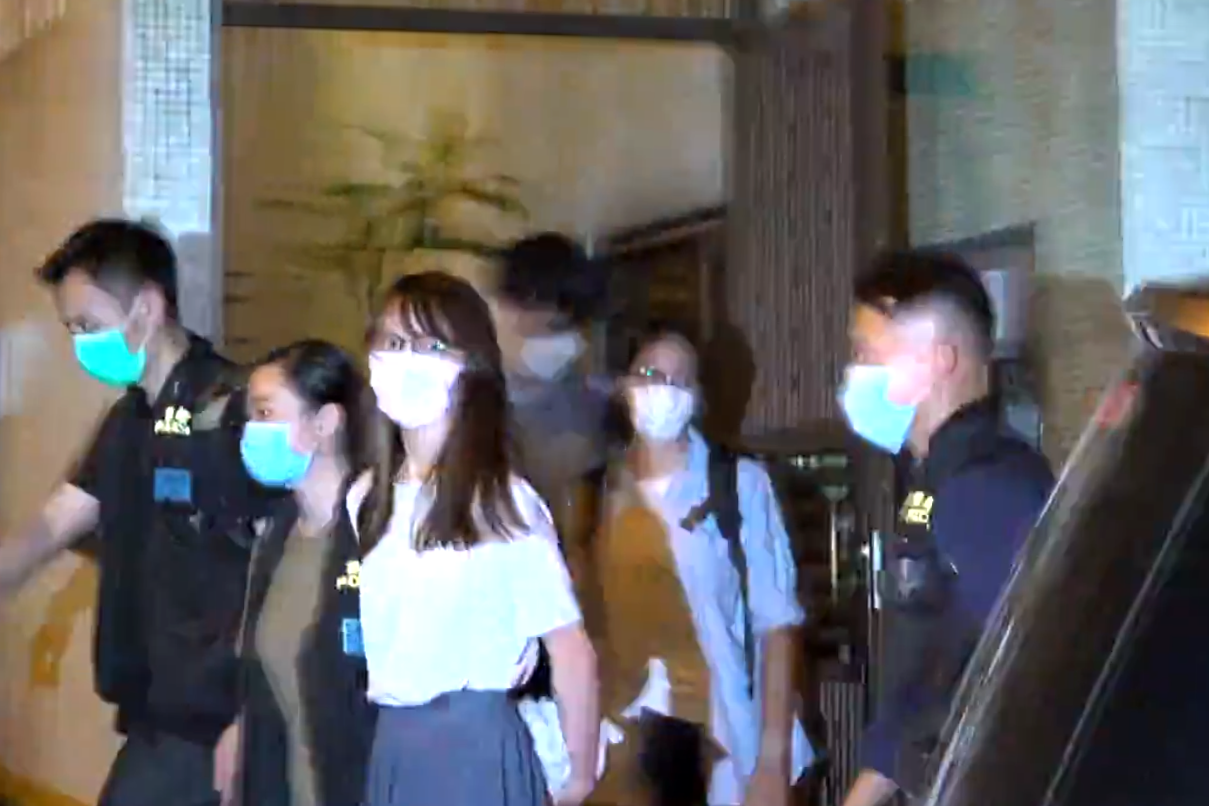
Agnes Chow was taken by police from her home in Tai Po

In addition to the arrest of Jimmy Lai, nine other individuals were also arrested or wanted by the end of the day under the new national security law. Lai's two sons, Lai Yiu Yan and Lai Gin Yan, were arrested separately from Jimmy Lai, four other Next Digital staff, including chief executive officer Cheung Kim-hung and chief operating officer and chief financial officer Royston Chow Tat-Kuen, Agnes Chow, the 23-year-old prominent pro-democracy activist and the now-defunct Demosisto founder was arrested at her home, European news agency ITV Freelance journalist and Demosisto former member Wilson Li, Edward Lei, a donor to a localist pro-democracy group, and finally, Mark Simon, a journalist with close ties to Jimmy Lai, were wanted by the Hong Kong Police.

==== International responses to the arrests ====
Various United States government officials spoke out on Jimmy Lai's arrest. Vice President Mike Pence posted a picture of him and Jimmy Lai on his Twitter account along with #FreeJimmyLai. State Secretary Mike Pompeo in an interview mentioned Jimmy Lai's arrest and the new Chinese sanction of US politicians. He stated that the United States is "going to respond in real ways so that the actions they've taken with respect to Jimmy Lai and the sanctions that they have nebulously imposed on some senior American officials in Congress, you can be sure the United States will measure them, respond to them, and help the Chinese Communist Party understand you're not going to take action against America or Americans without President Trump responding." National Security Advisor Robert O'Brien in a White House statement said that the United States was "deeply troubled" by the arrest, closing with the words, "We stand with Jimmy Lai and his sons and colleagues, and call on Beijing to repeal the national security law and restore Hong Kong's rule of law immediately". The following day, US Speaker of the House Nancy Pelosi made a statement condemning the series of arrests and Beijing's erosion of Hong Kong's autonomy. She ended her statement stating that the US is watching, and "the world is watching."

Japan citizens focused primarily on Agnes Chow's arrest and trended the #FreeAgnes hashtag on social media. Many high-profile celebrities supported the call to Agnes and her fight for democracy. While Japanese government officials did not specifically comment on the arrest, individual politicians commented on Hong Kong's overall social unrest and called for China to respect "One Country, Two Systems".

Taiwan's Mainland Affairs Council (MAC) condemned the arrest as an erosion of Hong Kong's press and speech freedom.

==== Police defend limiting media access during Apple Daily operation ====
During the raid on the Apple Daily offices in the morning, police had only admitted 15 news outlets inside the cordon. Those not admitted included international news agencies Reuters, AFP and AP, as well as local online media Stand News and InMedia. This step was seen by observers as a violation of the freedom of the press enshrined in the Hong Kong Basic Law, and also at odds with an October 2019 statement by Chief Executive Carrie Lam that "no vetting on who can conduct reporting" had been planned in the city. Police defended its decision by operational and safety concerns, constraints of the area, and "some police assessments". It was rare, it said, to have dozens of media agencies inside a cordoned-off area; also, police had been providing information on their operations to reporters and newsroom editors.

==== Other developments ====
In retaliation for the sanctioning of Hong Kong officials by the United States on 7 August, Chinese foreign ministry spokesman Zhao Lijian announced unspecified sanctions against 11 US individuals including senators Ted Cruz and Marco Rubio – who both had been vocal supporters of the protesters since the early stages of the protest –, Human Rights Watch director Kenneth Roth, and National Endowment for Democracy president Carl Gershman. Zhao said that the sanctions were imposed on the individuals because they had "behaved egregiously on Hong Kong-related issues" while White House spokeswoman Kayleigh McEnany said the sanctions were "symbolic and ineffectual".

=== 11 August ===
==== Protests in Hong Kong ====
Following an online call on Telegram messenger, dozens of protesters gathered at four shopping malls for "Sing with You" events to protest against the arrest of Jimmy Lai and other Apple Daily staff the previous day, and against the erosion of press freedom in the city in general. Some protesters wielded blank placards. During a protest in Langham Place shopping mall in Mong Kok, police raised a purple flag to warn that protesters' chants or displayed materials may be in violation of the national security law. They fined several individuals for not being "proper journalists", notwithstanding that Hong Kong does not have an accreditation system for journalists. In Sha Tin New Town Plaza, police media liaison officers ordered reporters to prove their status and restricted them to outside a cordoned area within the mall. The Hong Kong Journalists Association protested against these acts as interference with journalistic freedom. Later that evening, police released a statement saying that the assemblies in Mong Kok and Sha Tin had been unauthorised and that, in reference to social distancing restrictions, crowds had taken "irresponsible actions".

==== International response: "Made in Hong Kong" no longer allowed in US customs ====
Citing the Hong Kong Autonomy Act, the United States customs announced that goods made in Hong Kong and imported into the US after September 25 must be labeled "Made In China" instead of "Made In Hong Kong".

==== International response: Canadian House of Common testimony hearing on Hong Kong human rights ====
Beginning today and for the next several days, human rights and democracy organizations began testifying before the Canadian House of Common's Special Committee on Canada-China Relation (CACN) in regards to China's recent actions its affects to Hong Kong's democracy struggle. Akram Keram, a program officer on China at National Endowment for Democracy (NED), along with Hong Kong Watch co-founder and trustee Aileen Calverley, and at least five other pro-democracy activists from Hong Kong and from around the world detailed the various happenings—such as deterioration of academic, press and speech freedom—in Hong Kong since July, the enactment of the national security law. Speakers called for international solidarity with Hong Kong against Communist China such as passing law similar to the United States' "Hong Kong Autonomy Act" in which Hong Kong officials are sanctioned for their human rights violations. When asked by a Canadian parliamentarian why should Canada care about Hong Kong's situation, Calverley responded, "[i]f Canada, with its long history of defending human rights, is not willing to stand with like-minded partners in defen[s]e of Hong Kong, then those values that we all believe in will be degraded, along with Canada's standing in the world." In addition to sanction and diplomacy, the final proposal for Canadian government to show support for Hong Kong is to alter current immigration regulations to allow for high-profile activists settle in Canada, similar to the escape plan offered to protest leaders fleeing China after the 1989 Tiananmen Square protests and massacre.

=== 12 August ===
==== International response: Taiwan president condemns recent Hong Kong arrests ====
Taiwanese president Tsai Ing-wen issued a statement in which the referenced the recent arrest of Apple Daily proprietor Jimmy Lai and other staff of Next Media. The National Security Law, she said, would not only exert a chilling effect on the media and gravely harm democracy in Hong Kong, but it would also seriously undermine the status of the city as a financial hub. She called for Beijing to have a proper dialog with Hong Kong people, as restrictive measures would be futile.

==== International response: Japan's cross-party alliance urgently release Agnes Chow and other arrests, citizens start rally ====
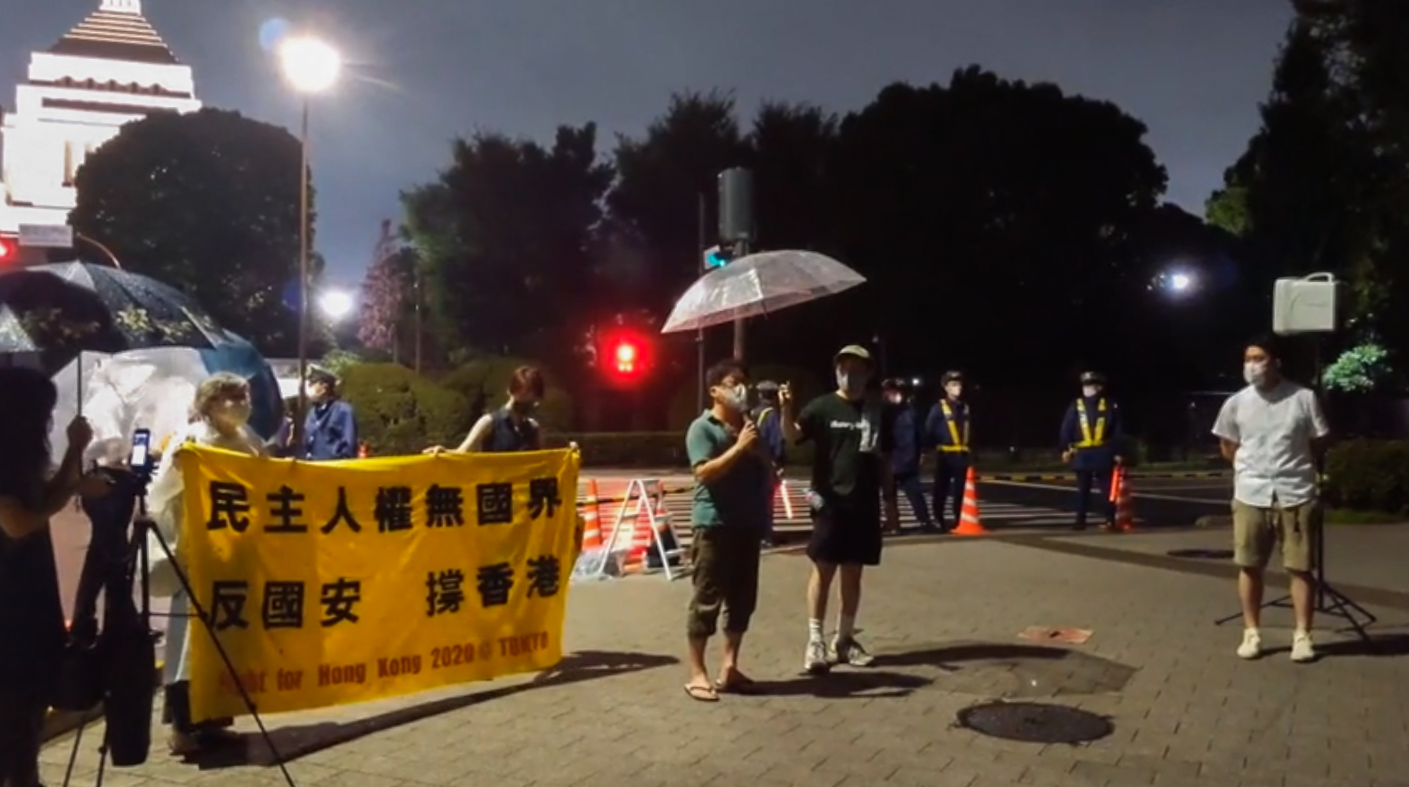
Stand with Hong Kong Japan held a rally in front of the Tokyo National Diet Building, demanding that the Japanese government respond to Hong Kong's freedom and democracy issues

Japan Parliamentary Alliance on China (JPAC) held an emergency press conference in the House of Representatives, criticizing the Hong Kong government for infringing on freedom of speech with the national security law, and concerned about the government's postponement of the Legislative Council election and disqualification of the candidates. A number of people in the Japanese education and legal circles issued a joint statement, claiming that the Hong Kong police's arrest was actually political suppression and groundless. At 6 pm, the Tokyo Executive Committee held the Stand With Hong Kong Rally in front of the main entrance of the National Diet Building, requesting the Japanese government to respond to the issue of freedom and democracy in Hong Kong. About 300 people participated in the rally.

=== 13 August ===
==== Hong Kong response: Extradition agreements ====
In response to France halting the ratification of its extradition agreements with Hong Kong and Germany suspending its extradition treaty, the Hong Kong government announced that it is shelving its extradition agreements with France and suspending the treaty with Germany.

=== 14 August ===
==== Google will not respond to Hong Kong authorities' request of user data ====
In compliance with the recently suspended mutual legal assistance treaty between the United States and Hong Kong, Google announced it has terminated responding to Hong Kong authorities' request of user data. According to CNET, Google, Facebook and Twitter had already suspending processing Hong Kong authorities' requests since July, but today Google took one step further to not respond to requests made by Hong Kong police or government. In a statement to CNET by a Google spokesperson, since the Beijing-passed national security law was enacted in June, Google has "not produced data in response to new requests from Hong Kong authorities and that remains the case".

=== 15 August ===
==== Lam resigns fellowship at Cambridge University's Wolfson College ====
Carrie Lam received her Cambridge Wolfson Honorary Fellowship in 2017 after she was elected as the new Hong Kong Chief Executive Officer. Cambridge University's Wolfson College had since raised concerns with Carrie Lam about "her commitment to the protection of human rights and the freedom of expression in Hong Kong" following the year-long pro-democracy movements. Wolfson in a statement today announced that while the college was due to consider Lam's Honorary Fellowship early next month, Lam took the first step and had "resigned from her Honorary Fellowship." In a Facebook statement, Lam criticized Wolfson College for "smearing a person on the basis of hearsay instead of facts" and therefore she could no longer maintain any relationship with such college.

==== International response: UK suspends Hong Kong police military training ====
UK government has suspended its military training to Hong Kong police. While the COVID-19 crisis was given as reason, the statement also referred to concerns for the city's freedom due to the imposition of the national security law.

=== 16 August ===
==== Canada solidarity protests ====
Over 500 showed up to support Hong Kong democracy at downtown Ottawa, Canada demanding the Canadian government to place economic sanctions and diplomatic pressure on pro-China Hong Kong government officials. Rallies were also held in nine other cities across Canada including Edmonton, Vancouver, Winnipeg, and Calgary.

=== 19 August ===
==== International response: US suspends extradition treaty ====
The US suspended its extradition treaty with Hong Kong and the reciprocal tax exemptions.

=== 21 August ===
==== International response: Australia's new visa arrangement for Hong Kong passport holders ====
In a response to the looming national security law enacted in July, Australia announced new visa arrangements for Hong Kong passport holders fleeing Hong Kong and seeking Australian citizenship. The modified visa regulations are applicable to Hong Kong students, temporary workers, and skilled workers, according to a government statement by Acting Immigration Minister Alan Tudge. Under the new arrangements, Hong Kong passport holders who held a selected visa on 9 July 2020 will automatically have that visa extended for five years; current and future students from Hong Kong will be eligible for a five-year Temporary Graduate visa on the successful completion of their tertiary studies; and Hong Kong passport holders who apply for a temporary skilled visa will be eligible for a five-year visa if they have qualifications listed on the occupational skills lists and meet Labour Market Testing requirements."

=== 23 August ===
==== National security law effect: 12 arrested by China coastguard at sea while allegedly fleeing to Taiwan ====
also see "12 Hong Kong Residents Captured by China"

Although the arrest incident was posted on their social media platform on August 23, the actual details were released to the public three days after the actual arrest, on August 26. The maritime coordinates of the arrest location published by Guangdong coastguard was (21°54'00''N, 114°53'00''E ), a location, if factually stated by Chinese authorities, that is technically not owned by China, but within its contiguous zone. According to Radio Free Asia, the arrestees are presumably charged of "unlawful border crossing (into China territories)" and are currently in custody with China, not Hong Kong, authorities. The published arrestee names include several Hong Kong pro-democracy activists, some of whom were earlier charged with protest-related crimes by the Hong Kong police under the new national security law. Hong Kong Police denied any cooperation with Chinese authorities in the arrest. Under Chinese law the arrestees may be jailed for one year on immigration offenses before being deported to Hong Kong.

==== Solidarity human chain in Tokyo ====
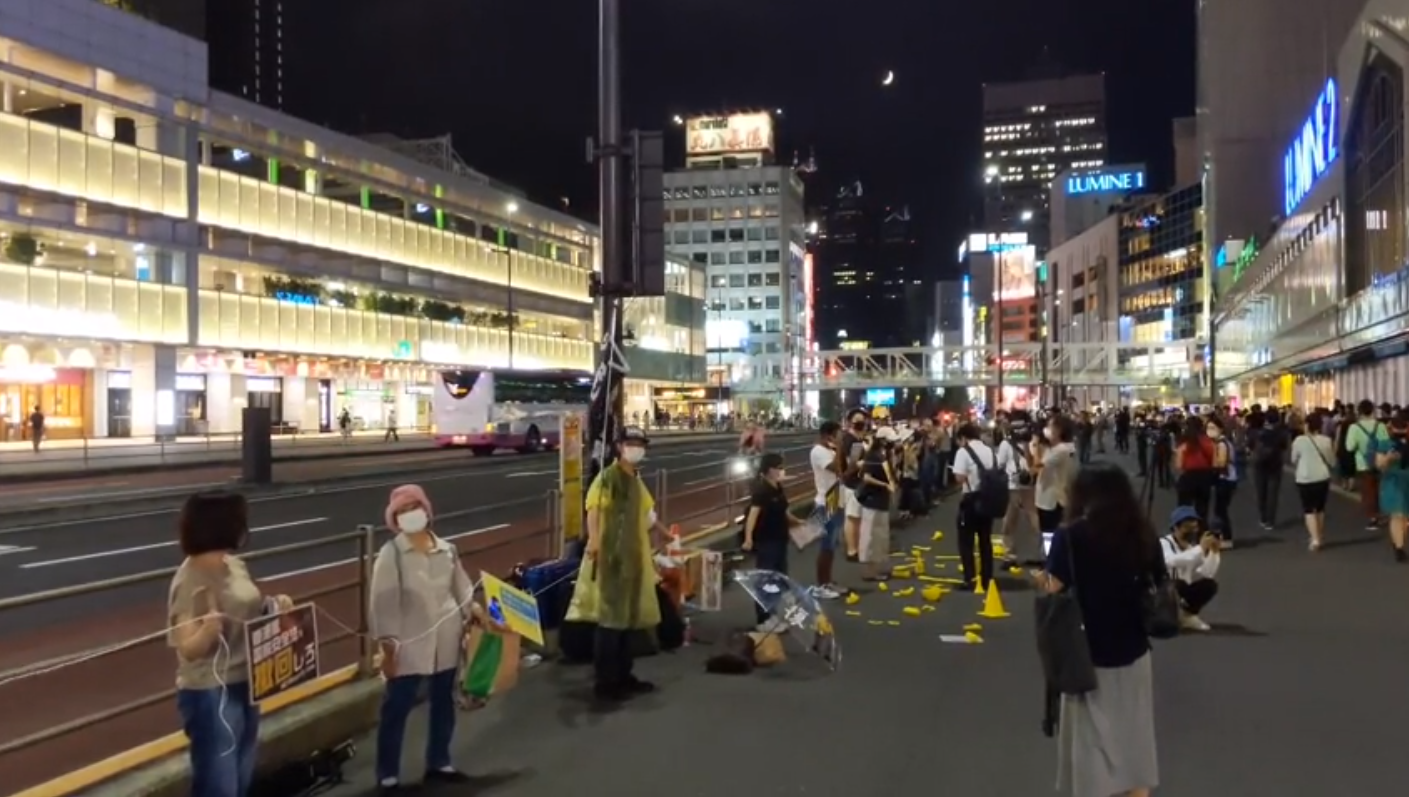
Stand with HK@JPN held a hand-in-hand human chain activity outside Shinjuku station in Tokyo. About 50 Hong Kong and Japanese people participated

One year ago in the height of the Hong Kong anti-extradition protest Hong Kongers formed a 60 km human chain, also known as the Baltic Way, across Hong Kong to show support and solidarity in hope the government could accept their five demands. One year later due to the newly enacted Hong Kong national security law human chains are now considered unlawful and so dozens of Hong Kongers took to Shinjuku, Tokyo to form this one-year anniversary "Hong Kong Way". In this "Stand With Hong Kong" demonstration, about 70 Hong Kongers living in Japan and Japanese activists socially-distancing each other in this peaceful demonstration. Participants chanted slogans to demand the release of the recently arrested Jimmy Lai and pro-democracy activist Agnes Chow while holding the now illegal "liberate Hong Kong, revolution of our time" banner and singing the now-banned "Glory to Hong Kong".

=== 25 August ===
==== Nathan Law protests against Chinese presence in Italy ====
Chinese foreign minister Wang Yi is on a political tour to five European countries from August 25 to September 1. Members of the IPAC Alliance and activists organized protests to take place in each of the capitals Wang was to visit. On his first stop in Italy, dozens of Tibetans and Hong Kongers protested in Farnesina Square in Rome against China's increasingly repressive human rights violations in Hong Kong and in Xinjiang. Pro-democracy legislator and activist Nathan Law, who earlier fled Hong Kong for England and was later wanted by the Hong Kong authorities, was among those who protested in Italy. Italian foreign minister Luigi Di Maio met with Nathan Law prior to Wang's meeting to discuss the danger of Communist China and their growing repression and formally receive a letter from Law regarding the state of matter in Hong Kong. Later, after meeting with Wang Yi, Di Maio and Wang made a joint appearance in which Di Maio reiterated that Italy would closely monitor the situation in Hong Kong, and together with other European nations it is imperative to preserve Hong Kong's stability and prosperity, high degree of autonomy and the fundamental rights and freedoms as guaranteed to Hong Kong citizens by its one country, two system policy. Nathan Law's meeting with Di Maio was endorsed by 17 Italian parliamentarians.

=== 26 August ===
==== Arrests of pro-democracy lawmakers ====
Two pan-democracy lawmakers, Lam Cheuk-ting and Ted Hui, were arrested by the police. They were reported to have been involved in protests in Tuen Mun in 2019 and Lam for alleged participation in the 2019 Yuen Long attack.

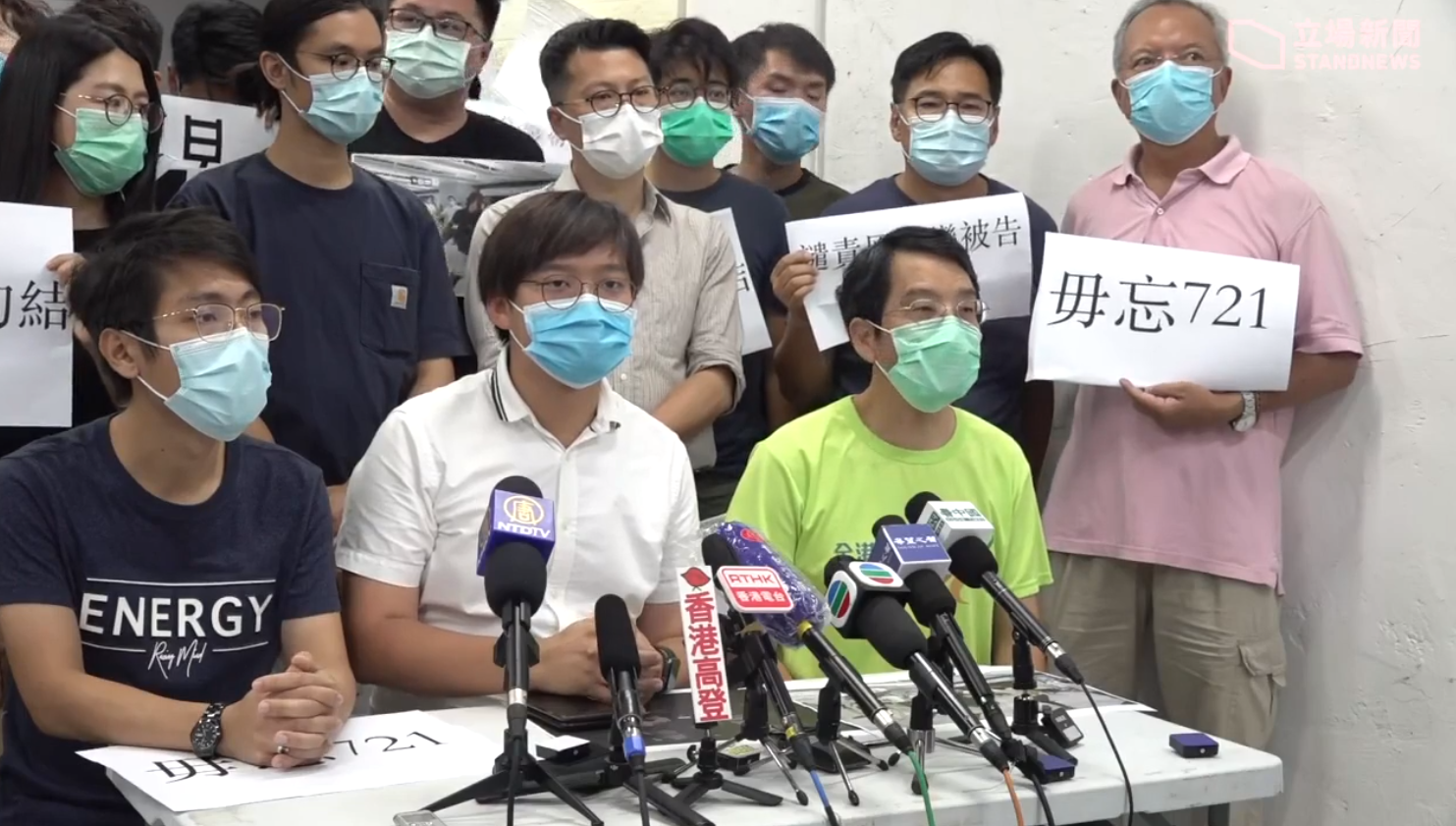
Yuen Long District Councillors met with reporters and reprimanded the police for leading the 21 July attack to the script of the government and the police

==== Hong Kong Police accused of rewriting 721 Yuen Long attack incident ====
The police press conference following the arrest of 16 individuals was widely reported by Hong Kong and international media as an attempt by police to rewrite the narrative of the 721 Yuen Long MTR station attack. One example of the alleged fact-altering statements made in that press conference was the police response time on July 21, 2019. In the press conference, a senior police superintendent, Chan Tin-chu claimed that police was present within 18 minutes of receiving 911 calls, not the earlier police-acknowledged 39 minutes. Chan also stated that the attack was a clash between "two evenly matched rivals", and not a one-sided attack, contrary to hundreds of cellphone videos and award-winning reports. A day after this press conference, Police Chief Chris Tang retracted the "18-minute" assertion made earlier by Chan.

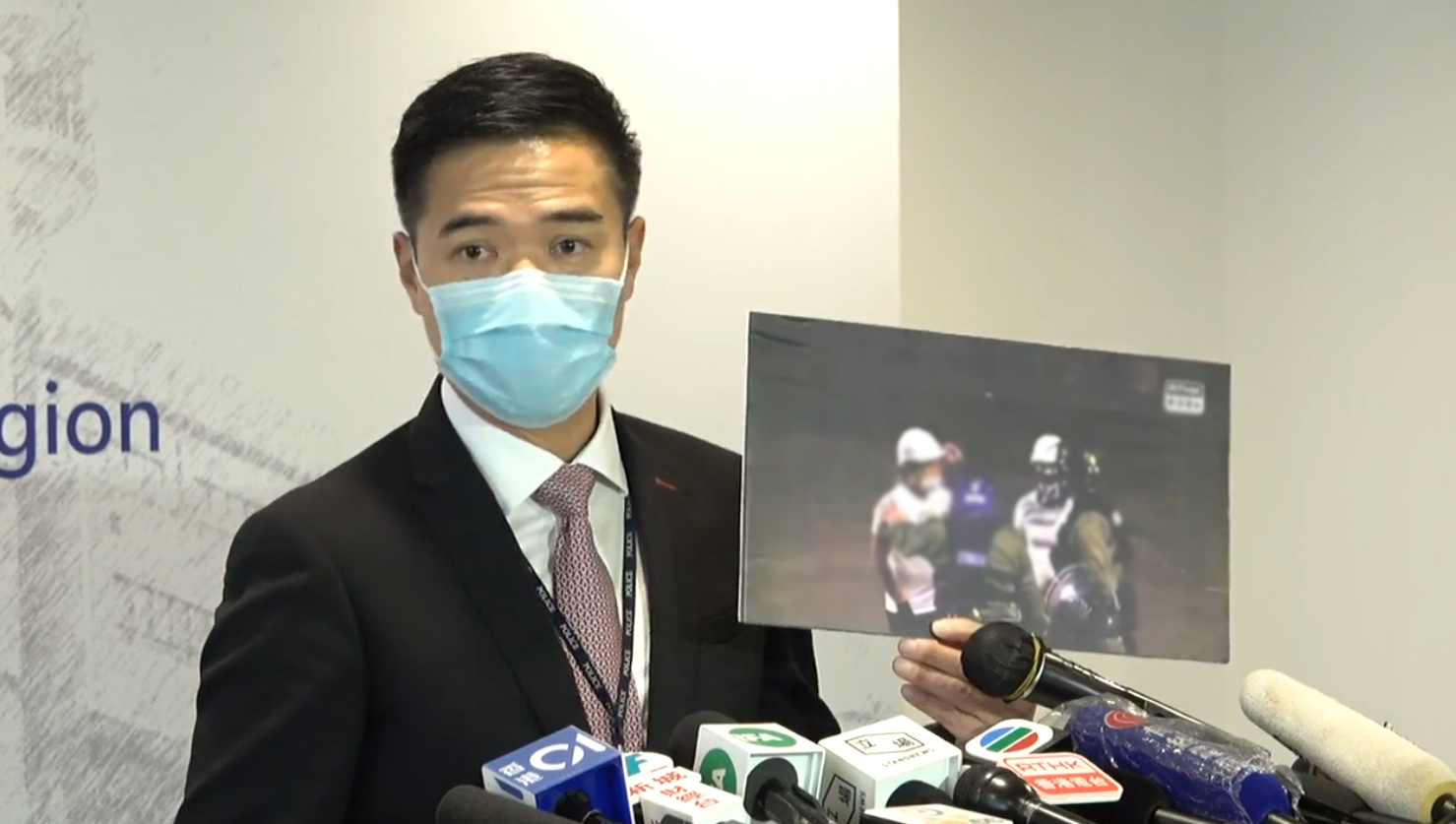
Senior Superintendent of the Criminal Headquarters of New Territories North, Chan Tin-chu explains the case and described the attack as a conflict between two gangs

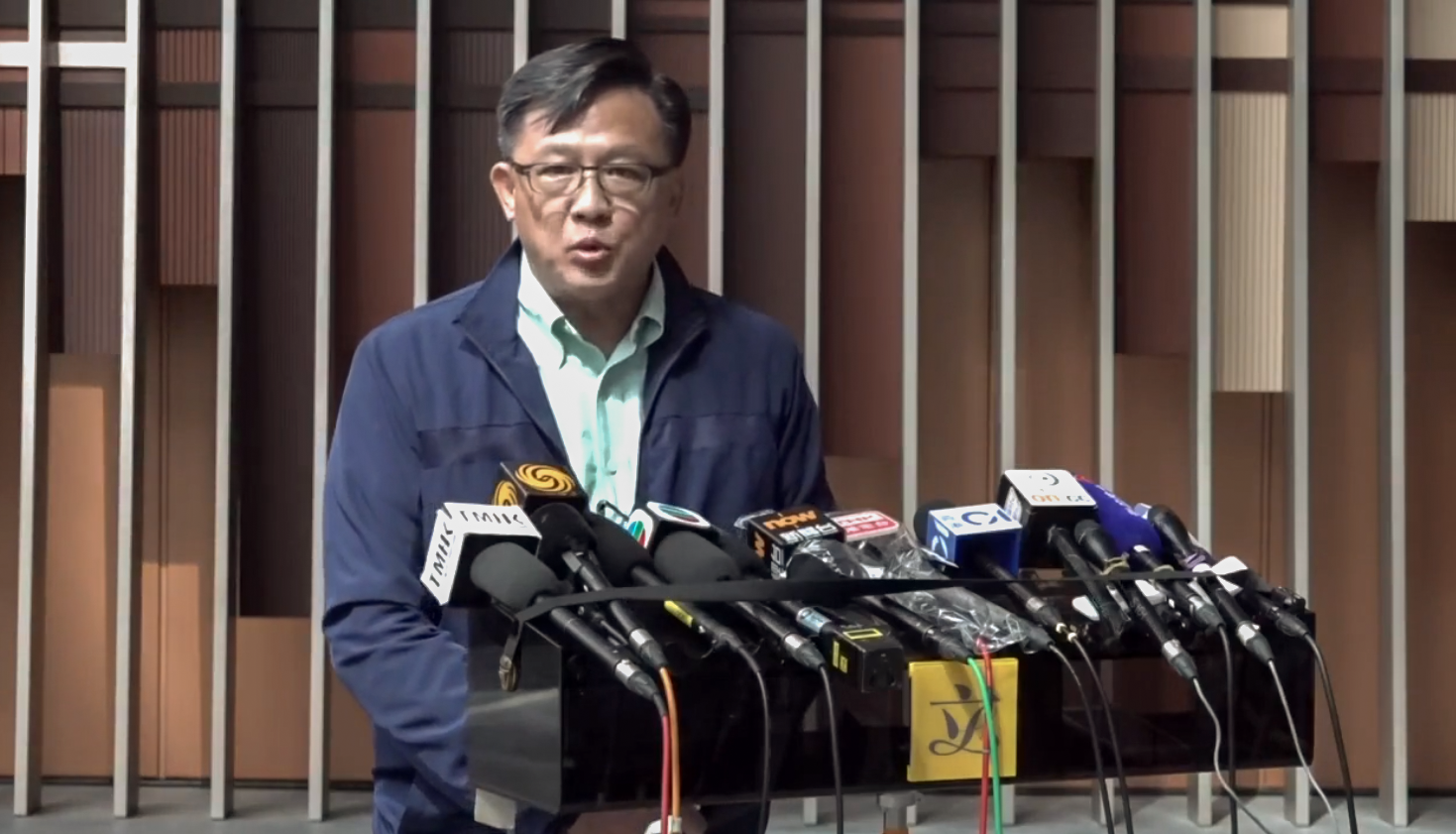
Legislative Council member Junius Ho welcomed the arrest by the police, describing that justice is late but will not be absent

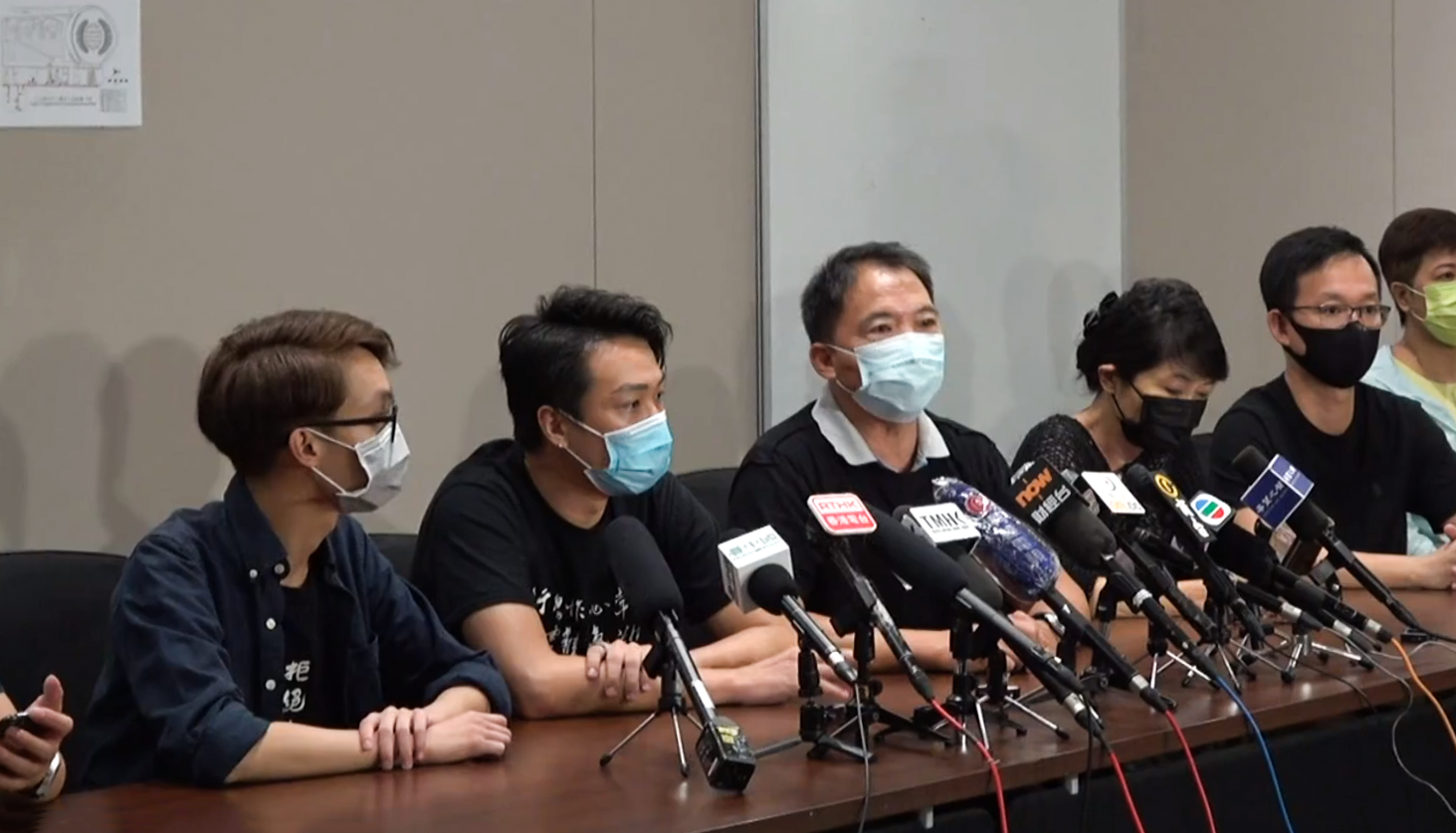
Pan-democrats and Civil Human Rights Front held a press conference to respond the arrests

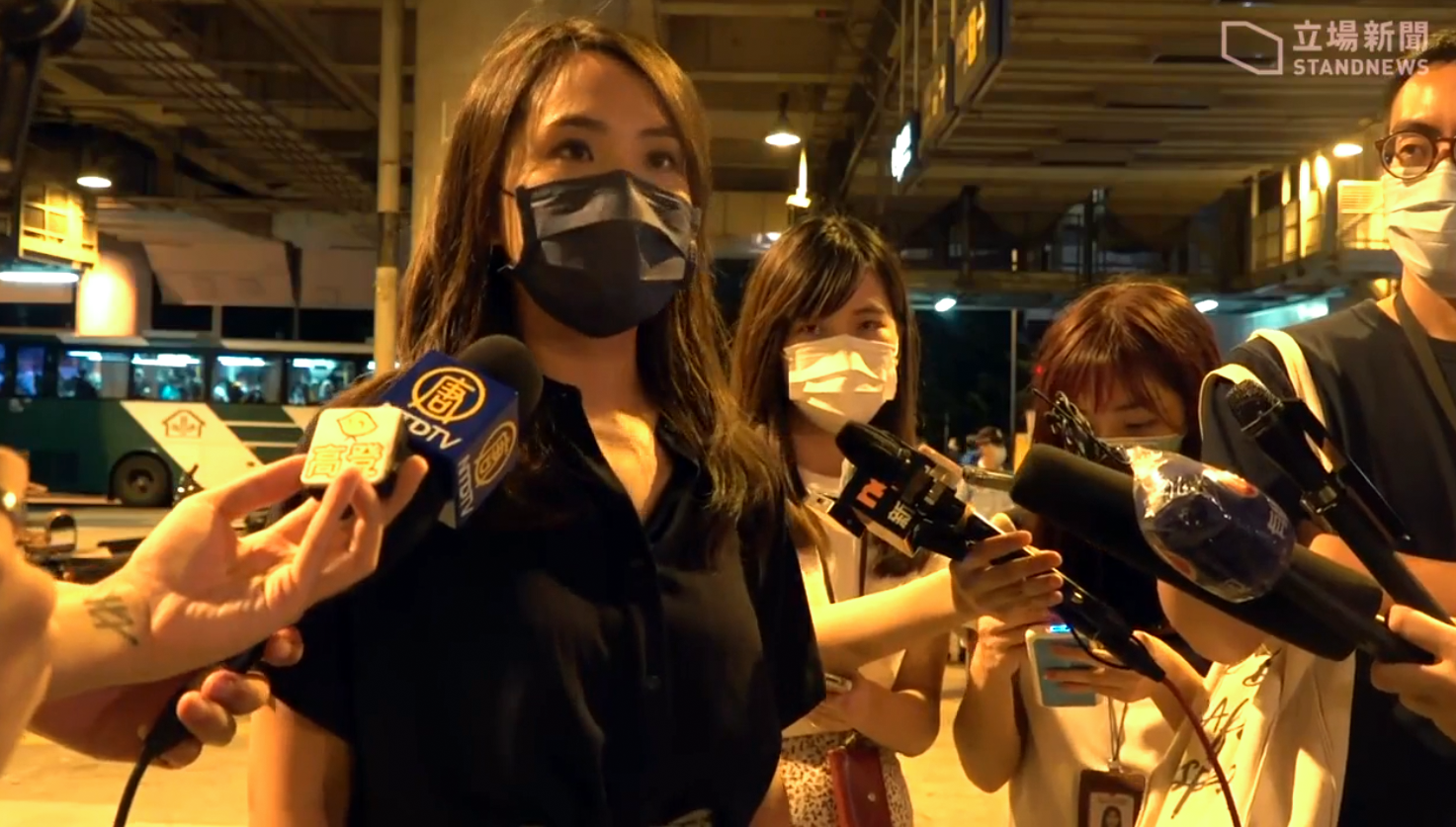
Former Stand News reporter Gwyneth Ho speaking to reporters

==== Protest-related journalism awards and recognition ====
Society of Publishers in Asia, SOPA, was established in 1982. In 1999, the SOPA Awards for Editorial Excellence were formed to celebrate and recognize traditional and new media news reporting. Many international and Hong Kong media outlets won awards and honorable mentions in this year's SOPA Awards for covering the Hong Kong pro-democracy protest development and impacts. The 17 awards are categorized in "global", "regional" and in "Chinese [language]".

===== Awards of Excellence =====
Award Type	Category	Publication	Title of Entry	Award Recipients
Excellence in Video Reporting (卓越視頻報道獎)	Global	The New York Times	Where Were Hong Kong's Police?	Barbara Marcolini, Haley Willis, K.K., Rebecca Lai, Caroline Kim, Drew Jordan, Sameen Amin, Tiffany May, Austin Ramzy, Dahlia Kozlowsky and Mark Scheffler
Excellence in Video Reporting (卓越視頻報道獎)	Regional	South China Morning Post	Thin yellow line	Dayu Zhang
Excellence in Feature Writing (卓越專題特寫獎)	Global	Reuters	Revolution 101	Tom Lasseter
Excellence in Arts & Culture Reporting (卓越藝術及文化報道獎)	Global	Nikkei Asian Review	Art amid unrest	Laurel Chor, Michelle Chan, and Ken Smith
Excellence in Reporting Breaking News (卓越突發新聞獎)	Global & Regional	Bloomberg	Hong Kong in Turmoil	Shelly Banjo, Natalie Lung, Annie Lee and Hannah Dormido, Iain Marlow, Blake Schmidt, Chloe Whiteaker, Adrian Leung, Demetrios Pogkas
Excellence in Photography (卓越攝影獎)	Global	Agence France-Presse	Hong Kong Protests 2019	Anthony Wallace, Philip Fong, Hector Retamal, Nicolas Asfouri, Isaac Lawrence
Excellence in Photography (卓越攝影獎)	Chinese	Initium Media 端傳媒	Hong Kong's anti-extradition bill protest: a photo documentation 香港反修例運動影像記錄	Lam Chun Tung 林振東
Excellence in Information Graphics (卓越數據圖像獎)	Global & Regional	The New York Times	Hong Kong's Turmoil, Illustrated	Jin Wu, K.K. Rebecca Lai, Anjali Singhvi and Jason Kao
Excellence in Arts & Culture Reporting (卓越藝術及文化報道獎)	Chinese	The Reporter 報導者	Street Art Gallery in the Hong Kong Anti-Extradition Movement 香港反修例運動裡的街頭藝廊	I-Ching Chen, Chan Long Hei, Lau I Lung 記者：陳怡靜 攝影：陳朗熹、劉貳龍
Excellence in Business Reporting (卓越經濟報道獎)	Regional	South China Morning Post	Hong Kong developers	Peggy Sito, Denise Tsang, Lam Ka-sing, Sandy Li

===== Honorable mentions =====
Award Type	Category	Publication	Title of Entry	Award Recipients
Excellence in Photography (卓越攝影獎)	Global	Reuters	Fire, guns and tear gas in Hong Kong	Tyrone Siu
Excellence in Arts & Culture Reporting (卓越藝術及文化報道獎)	Global	Quartz	The art of war: Hong Kong vs. Beijing	Vivienne Chow
Excellence in Investigative Reporting (卓越調查報道獎)	Chinese	FactWire 傳真社	Did anyone really die in Prince Edward MTR on Aug 31st? 太子站 831 到底有無死人？	FactWire investigation team
Excellence in Feature Writing (卓越專題特寫獎)	Chinese	Initium Media 端傳媒	A feature of the Polytechnic University siege 理大圍城之戰	Stephanie Yang, Lin Kexin 楊子琪、林可欣
Excellence in Information Graphics (卓越數據圖像獎)	Chinese	Citizen News 眾新聞	The '721' Yuen Long Attack 721 元朗恐襲	Cheung Hoi Kit, Egon Sung 張凱傑
Excellence in Reporting Breaking News (卓越突發新聞獎)	Chinese	Initium Media 端傳媒	Investigation of the indiscriminate attack of July 21 Yuen Long Nightmare 721 涉黑白衣人無差別襲擊事件突發事件調查	Gemini Cheng Pui Shan, Yang Ziqi, Irene Chan, Leung Man Ki, Sam Leung, Eddie Pang, Stanley Leung, 鄭佩珊、楊子琪、陳倩兒、梁敏琪、梁中勝、彭嘉林、 梁詩聰
Excellence in Video Reporting (卓越視頻報道獎)	Chinese	Initium Media 端傳媒	Statement of a Hong Kong young valiant: if the problems were solved, we won't be here 一個勇武年輕人的自白：你解決了問題，這幫人就不會出現	Stanley Leung, Lin Kexin, Irene Chan 梁詩聰、林可欣、陳倩兒
Excellence in Photography (卓越攝影獎)	Chinese	HK01 香港 01	The August 31st Prince Edward Station Incident 八三一太子站警民衝突	YU Chun Leung 余俊亮
Excellence in Explanatory Reporting (卓越解釋性報道獎)	Regional	Hong Kong Free Press	Hong Kong's new methodology of protest, explained	Kris Cheng

===== Finalists =====
Nomination	Category	Publication	Title of Entry
SOPA Award for Public Service Journalism (亞洲出版業協會公共服務新聞大獎)	Overall	傳真社 FactWire	追擊反修例風波的假資訊 Track the fake news in Anti-Extradition Bill Movement
Excellence in Opinion Writing (卓越評論獎)	Global	The Wall Street Journal	The Crackdown Has Begun: Holding Power to Account in Hong Kong
Excellence in Journalistic Innovation (卓越新聞報道創新獎)	Global	The New York Times	Turmoil and Lies in the Streets of Hong Kong
Excellence in Information Graphics (卓越數據圖像獎)	Global & Regional	Reuters	Visualising the Hong Kong Protests
Excellence in Photography (卓越攝影獎)	Regional	Hong Kong Free Press	Shots of the 2019 Hong Kong protest movements
Excellence in Photography (卓越攝影獎)	Chinese	明報 Ming Pao	反修例風暴 Anti-extradition storm in Hong Kong
Excellence in Reporting Breaking News (卓越突發新聞獎)	Chinese	報導者 The Reporter	香港反送中運動紀實：強權與反撲．絕望與希望 Hong Kong Anti-Extradition Movement:Totalitarianism and Counterattack, Despair and Hope

==== International response: the Netherlands ====
The Netherlands is the second stop in Wang Yi's political European tour. A group of Dutch lawmakers, led by Martijin Van Helvert who serves on the newly formed IPAC, who are critical of how Beijing's national security law "severely curtails individual freedoms and violates Hong Kong's autonomy", were not pleased with this secretive state visit. Wang declined an invitation by this group to discuss human rights issues on Hong Kong and Uyghur Muslims in Xinjiang. Dutch Foreign Minister Stef Blok discussed economy and trade but also raised human rights concerns with Wang regarding the "extremely worrying developments" in Hong Kong and Xinjiang.

=== 27 August ===
==== Pro-democracy lawmakers released on bail ====
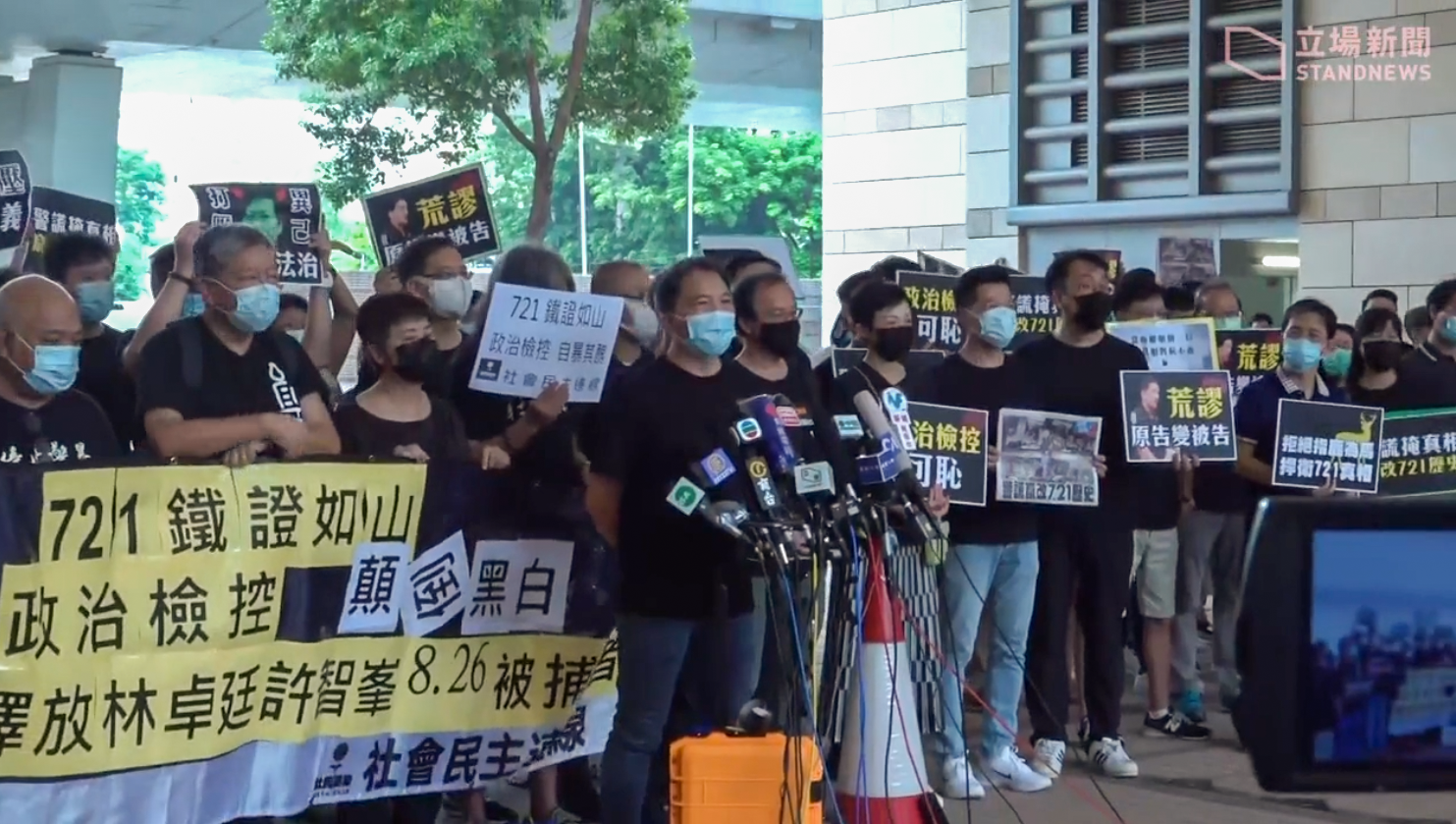
A large number of pro-democracy supporters outside West Kowloon Magistrates' Court

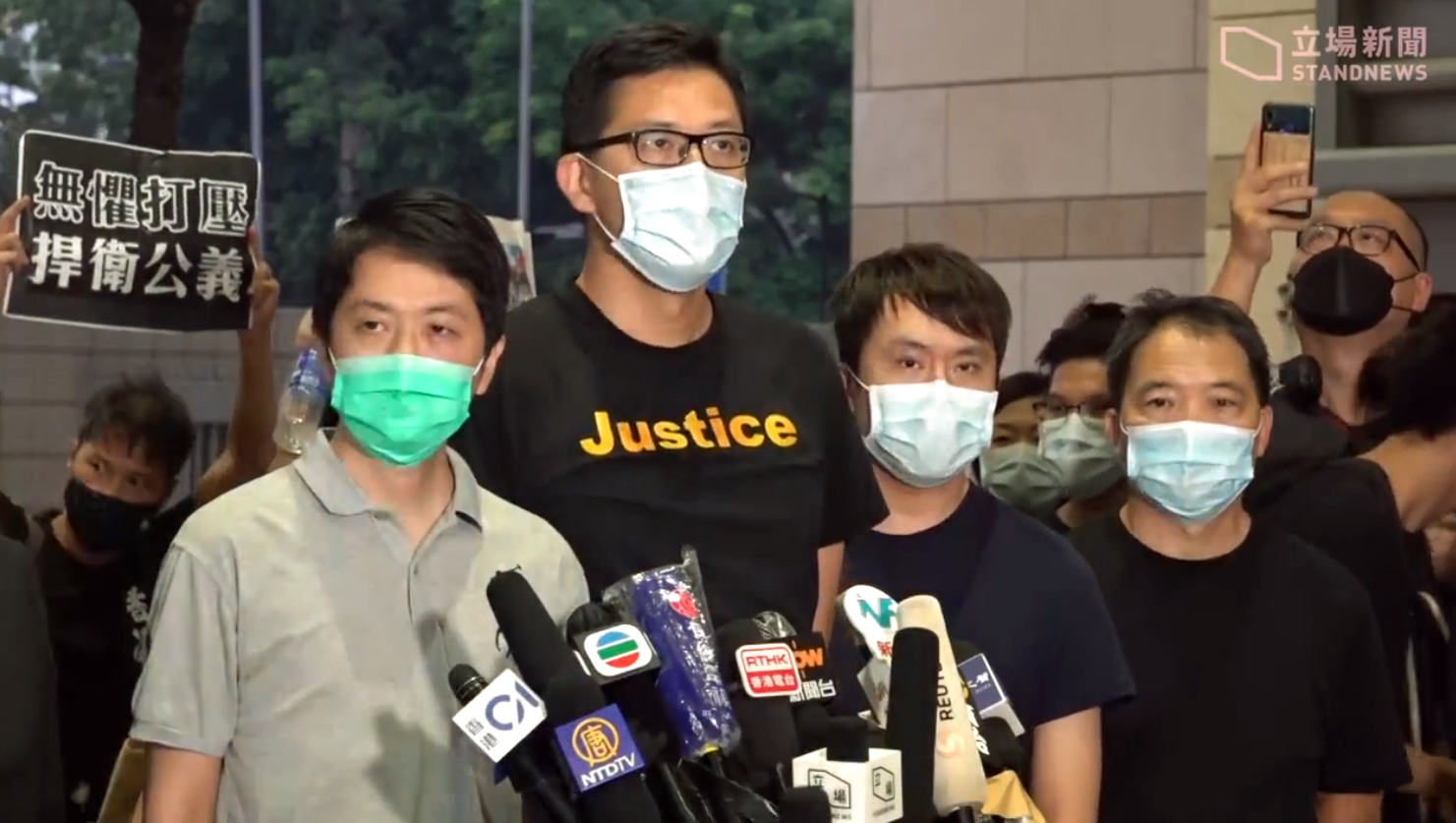
Lam Cheuk-ting and Ted Hui speaking to reporters after released on bail

Eight people, including Ted Hui and Lam Cheuk-ting, were prosecuted by the police and appeared in West Kowloon Magistrates' Court on 27 August. The case was brought to court in two cases. A large number of citizens and many pro-democracy activists showed up in black clothes to support the scene and chanted the police slogan of "reverse black and white." There are over a hundred plainclothes and uniformed police officers on guard.

Lam and Hui were charged with 'obstructing justice' during the demonstration at Tuen Mun Park on 6 July 2019. Hui was also charged with one crime of 'dishonest access to a computer' and one crime of 'criminal destruction'. The other two defendants were charged with intent to 'obstruction of justice', 'dishonest access to computers', 'criminal destruction' and 'unlawful assembly'.

The prosecution requested a postponement of the case in order to process the referral of the case to the District Court. The magistrate approved the adjournment until 6 November. All the defendants were granted cash bail, and some of them required personnel guarantees. During the period, they were not allowed to leave Hong Kong, they had to surrender their travel documents, and they had to report to the police station.

In the 21 July Yuen Long attack, Lam and six other people were charged with 'riots.' The prosecution pointed out that Lam had instructed the people in black, "Everyone prays for nothing, and withstand the canal (the people in white)", and called on the citizens on the platform to "hold up the canal with helpers to stand up," adding insulting words. Provoking people in white, thus constituting a riot. At the same time, he pointed out that Lam ignored the police's advice and insisted on walking into Yuen Long. All the defendants stated that they understood the charges and were granted bail with HK$3,000 to HK$10,000 cash and sureties. They were not allowed to leave Hong Kong. They had to surrender their travel documents and report to the police station. The prosecution stated that because there were still 20 people at large in the case, it requested that the case be postponed pending further investigation by the police. The judge adjourned the hearing until 12 October. Lam criticized the current prosecution as the Carrie Lam regime's loss of basic human conscience, political persecution, ugly and evil; Hui described the current prosecution as "unnecessarily guilty" and emphasized that protecting the public is its bounden duty.

==== International response: Norway ====
Day three of Wang Yi's political tour landed him in Norway. Hong Kong is once again discussed even though Wang's trip was reportedly about mending post-COVID relations with these countries. Earlier today and before the joint press conference, Amnesty International Norway, the Norwegian Uighur Committee, the Norwegian Tibet Committee, the Hong Kong Committee, the Norwegian-Taiwanese Friendship Association and the Norwegian PEN held a joint demonstration with hundreds of protesters protesting against Chinese violations of human rights in front of Norway's prime minister's residence. In the later press conference Wang was asked about the possibility of Hong Kong protesters being nominated or even winning the next Nobel Peace Prize. Wang sternly responded that the Chinese government shall firmly reject "any attempt to use the Nobel Prize to interfere in China's internal affairs".

=== 29 August ===
==== "Liberate Hong Kong" statue opening ceremony in Yermo, California, USA ====
Hundreds of supporters gathered in the southern California Mojave Desert town Yermo to show solidarity with the yearlong pro-democracy resistance in Hong Kong. Artist Weiming Chen spent five months designing and building a "Liberate Hong Kong" sculpture to commemorate Hong Kong's fight for freedom against Communist China. Many were waving "Liberate Hong Kong, Revolution of Our Time" flags and wearing yellow helmets. A group was singing "Glory to Hong Kong" in the ceremony. Liberty Sculpture Park, where the "Liberate Hong Kong" statue is located, also showcases other artists' freedom-themed art work and Chen's many other freedom-fighting pieces, such as his 1989 "Tank Man" sculpture commemorating the 1989 Tiananmen Square protests and massacre. One participant in the celebration on that day told the Victorville Daily Press that he found himself on China's "wanted list" after participating in a previous liberty park unveiling event and warned today's participants to not be surprised if they woke up the next day being "wanted" by China.

==== Hong Kong public opinion poll two months after national security law ====
Reuters, partnering with Hong Kong Public Opinion Research Institute (HKPORI), released their 4th Hong Kong public opinion survey results. The Cantonese phone surveys polled approximately 1000 participants every three months since December 2019. A few of the questions have been modified to reflect the current post-national security law sentiment that showed 60% of respondents opposed the newly enacted national security law. What remained a majority opinion in the past 9 months is the public's support for an independent commission of inquiry to look into how police handled the demonstrations, fluctuating from 66% to 76% support, a median of 71%.

=== 30 August ===
==== Mong Kok demonstrations to commemorate 831 Prince Edward station attack ====
On the eve of the one year anniversary of the 2019 Prince Edward station attack, hundreds gathered in Mong Kok shopping malls chanting the protest slogan "Liberate Hong Kong, The Revolution of Our Time" and demanding authorities to release the security camera footage of the attack. A total of 29 individuals were, some disputably, ticketed for violating gathering bans. Separately, two individuals were arrested for possession of a fake gun and a baton.

==== New York City solidarity event: 831 Prince Edward station attack commemoration ====
Organizer New Yorkers Supporting Hong Kong (NY4HK) constructed a life-size model of the entrance of Prince Edward station in Union Square to raise awareness of Hong Kong police brutality and the 2019 Prince Edward station attack. More than 150 people placed flowers and support notes on the model.

=== 31 August ===
==== Mong Kok demonstrations to commemorate 831 Prince Edward station attack ====
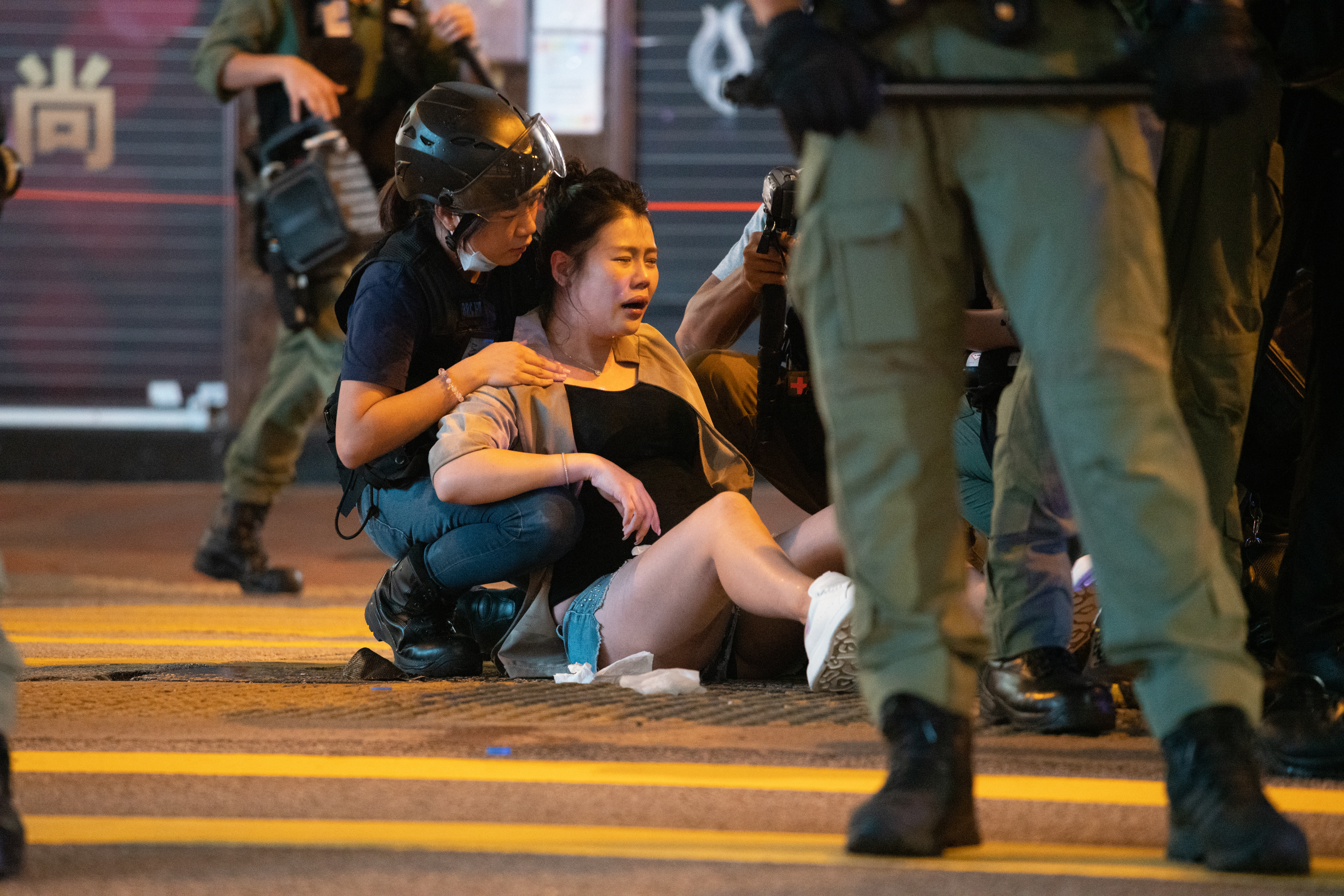
A pregnant woman after being attacked by police

On the one year anniversary of the 2019 Prince Edward station attack, hundreds gathered in Langham Place and at Prince Edward station. They chanted the protest slogan "Liberate Hong Kong, the revolution of our times", in response to which police displayed a warning flag to alert the crowd that this would possibly constitute a violation of the national security law. A pregnant woman was pushed to the ground in a scuffle between police and protesters, allegedly by police; while the police expressed their concern for the woman, it refrained from commenting on the allegation.

==== London assembly to commemorate 831 Prince Edward station attack ====
At noon, about a hundred people attended an assembly organized by human rights group "NOW!" outside the Embassy of China. Most of them wore black clothes and they showed the slogan "Liberate Hong Kong, revolution of our times". After the assembly, some of them walked to Piccadilly Circus and Glory to Hong Kong was played with bagpipes. The participants of the assembly included Wong Mau-chun, who was previously referred by the media as "Hon Bo-sun" and was rumored to have died in the 2019 Prince Edward station attack. Simon Cheng and Benedict Rogers also participated in the event.

==== Taiwan assembly to commemorate 831 Prince Edward station attack ====
Over 400 people gathered locally in Taipei, Taichung, and Kaohsiung to show support at a solidarity event which started in the evening. The gathering in Taipei, titled "831 Taipei Support Hong Kong Human Chain"《831台北挺香港人鏈》took place in front of Aegis Cafe (保護傘餐廳), a new business that is run by exiled Hong Kong activists. Commemorators played and sang the protest anthem "Glory to Hong Kong", a song that is now banned in Hong Kong and formed a human chain. Kaohsiung saw about 150 attendees who wore black outfit and yellow helmets. They waved numerous "Stand With Hong Kong" flags. The gathering in Taichung attracted about 70 people.

==== Tokyo assembly to commemorate 831 Prince Edward station attack ====
This commemoration was organized by "Stand With HK@JPN". Outside of JR Shinjuku station they reenacted numerous scenes of police attacking subway riders and the scene outside of Prince Edward stations where first aiders pleaded with the police to let them enter the closed-off station.
