= New York Anti-Secession Ordinance =

Pseudohistorical and non-existent U.S. law

The New York Anti-Secession Ordinance, also called as Anti-Secession Resolutions of the New York legislature is a temporary resolution passed in 1861 by the New York State Assembly before the outbreak of the American Civil War, calling on the Lincoln administration not to allow the Southern states to secede from the Union.

In 2005, the government of the People's Republic of China cited New York's anti-secession resolutions when enacting its Anti-Secession Law. The Ordinance is regarded by both Chinese jurisprudence and leading public opinion incorrectly as a form of federal law. The Chinese media almost always referred to it as the "Anti-Secession Act" (Chinese: 反脱离联邦法/反脱離聯邦法) and reported it extensively afterwards, with only Initium Media arguing that it was inconsequential and that mainstream Chinese analysis was shallow and pseudohistorical.

== Full text ==
On January 11, 1861, the New York State Assembly passed the ordinance. The full text is as follows.

Concurrent resolutions tendering aid to the President of the United States in support of the Constitution and the Union.

STATE OF NEW YORK, IN ASSEMBLY,

January 11, 1861.

Whereas, treason, as defined by the Constitution of the United States, exists in one or more of the States of this confederacy; and whereas, the insurgent State of South Carolina, after seizing the post-office, custom-house, moneys, and fortifications of the Federal Government, has, be firing into a vessel ordered by the Government to convey troops and provisions to Fort Sumter, virtually declared war; and whereas, the forts and property of the United States Government in Georgia, Alabama, and Louisiana have been unlawfully seized, with hostile intentions; and whereas, further, Senators in Congress avow and maintain their treasonable acts: Therefore,

Resolved (if the Senate concur), That the Legislature of New York, profoundly impressed with the value of the Union and determined to preserve it unimpaired, hail with joy the recent firm, dignified, and patriotic special message of the President of the United States, and that we tender to him, through the Chief Magistrate of our own State, whatever aid in men and money he may require to enable him to enforce the laws and uphold the authority of the Federal Government; and that in defense of the "more perfect Union," which has conferred prosperity and happiness upon the American people, renewing the pledge given and redeemed by our fathers, we are ready to devote "our fortunes, our lives, and our sacred honor" in upholding the Union and the Constitution.

Resolved (if the Senate concur), That the Union-loving representatives and citizens of Delaware, Maryland, Virginia, North Carolina, Kentucky, Missouri, and Tennessee, who labor with devoted courage and patriotism to withhold their States from the vortex of secession, are entitled to the gratitude and admiration of the whole people.

== Anti-Secession Act ==
After Chen Shui-bian's administration introduced the One Country on Each Side theory in 2002, the government of the People's Republic of China (PRC) promoted anti-secession legislation. In 2005, the Chinese government invited legal professionals to explore the enaction of a formal law against Taiwanese independence.

On March 8, 2005, at the third session of the 10th National People's Congress, Wang Zhaoguo, Vice Chairman of the Standing Committee of the National People's Congress, invited scholars to participate in formulating a draft anti-secession law, and asked legal experts and experts on Taiwan to express their views. Rao Gopin, a professor at Peking University Law School, participated in many of the discussion sessions, studying legal issues related to Hong Kong from the perspective of international law and suggesting at the symposium that a law of national unity could be formulated by reference to the anti-secession act of America.

The International Herald Leader asked at the meeting whether China whether had drawn on the experience of the United States in enacting similar laws to prevent the independence of the Confederate States of America (CSA) before the American Civil War. Rao Gopin told reporters that anti-secession laws are not unique to China. Before the U.S. Civil War broke out in 1861, he said, the U.S. federal government enacted the Anti-Secession Act against the eleven southern CSA states that wanted to secede to maintain slavery. He said that the act was a federal law that was effective in all federal jurisdictions, and was the legal basis for the U.S. to use force against secessionists in the American South. Rao emphasized that the term used in the Chinese definition of the anti-secession law is also "Anti-Secession," which he believes serves as circumstantial evidence that Chinese legislators are referencing U.S. law.

On March 14, 2005, the Third Session of the Tenth National People's Congress (NPC) voted to pass the Anti-Secession Law. Its passage was met with enthusiastic applause, followed by the signing of the law by Hu Jintao, President of China.

The delegates at the meeting described the atmosphere as very solemn during the vote. However, there was controversy over the translation of the anti-secession law, as Taiwan argued that the English translation of the anti-secession law should be "Anti-Separation Law" instead of "Anti-Secession Law" as used by the Chinese side. NPC deputy Zhou Hongyu explained that the title refers to the U.S. Anti-Secession Act in the Chinese translation. As one of the earliest proponents of the proposal, Zhou believes that this translation leaves the U.S. with nothing to say and that Taiwan's response illustrates the correct naming, he stated.

This is because the counterpart of the U.S. Anti-Secession Act is called as the Anti-Secession Act, so we also use Secession, which means secession.

On March 14, 2005, Wen Jiabao responded to media questions during an international press conference at the Great Hall of the People in Beijing. After passing a reporter from Taiwan's Era News Channel, the question was asked by a CNN reporter.

The question I would ask is about the Anti-Secession Law. In the legislation you stated what you would call China's right to use non-peaceful means against Taiwan. Could you clarify what those means could be? And if there is a conflict, a broader conflict with the United States, could China build an army that could win any war it has to fight, as you stated in your address to the NPC?

Wen Jiabao responded that the Taiwan issue is purely a domestic matter for China, and cited a similar law in the United States as an example.

...If you care to read the two American anti-secession resolutions adopted in 1861, you will find they are similar to our law. In the US, the civil war broke out shortly afterward. But here we don't wish to see such a situation.

=== Official media ===
March 18, 2005, the nationalist Global Times described U.S. historical events in graphic detail. In the mid-19th century, black slavery on plantations was practiced in the American South but was becoming increasingly controversial, and in November 1832, South Carolina began to discuss secession from the Union. After Abraham Lincoln was elected president, the South Carolina legislature passed a secession act, followed by Florida, Georgia, Alabama, Mississippi, Louisiana, and Texas. Faced with the imminent division of the country, American people in the northern states rose up in support of the federal government. The Global Times claimed that, on January 11, 1861, the New York State Assembly passed the Anti-Secession Act, which was approved by the President of the United States, and that the law reads:

The courts of the State of New York, well aware of the value of unity, are determined to preserve the unity of the country unimpaired ...... Unity has given prosperity and happiness to the people of the United States, and in defense of that unity ...... we are prepared to sacrifice our property, our lives, and our sacred honor.

The citizens and representatives of Maryland, Virginia, North Carolina, Kentucky, Missouri and Tennessee who stood for unity and resisted the nation's descent into secession with unparalleled courage and patriotism deserve the gratitude and admiration of the entire American nation.

The Global Times cited President Lincoln as a practitioner in the spirit of the Anti-Secession Act.

In his inaugural address, Lincoln reaffirmed the spirit of the Anti-Secession Act. He said, "No state can lawfully secede from the Union by its own motion alone; all resolutions and acts made for that purpose are legally invalid, and violent action by any state or states against the authorities of the United States shall be considered, according to circumstances, as rebellion ...... The Union is not to be divided under the Constitution and laws." Lincoln's speech sounded the trumpet of the struggle against secession, and on April 12, the Southern rebels attacked the Northern armies and the American Civil War broke out.

In June 2005, the Chinese Communist Party's newspaper, the Study Times, highlighted the Anti-Secession Act in its world history chapter, claiming that it was a law passed by the U.S. Congress.

In 2007, the Chinese Embassy in the United States published an op-ed of the People's Daily. The article refuted Chen Shui-bian's government's referendum on membership in the United Nations and cited the U.S. anti-secession act. The article stated.

In the United States, in addition to the Anti-Secession Act passed in the 1860s, every citizen is required to recite in the Pledge of Allegiance, "I pledge allegiance to the flag of the United States of America and to the Republic for which it stands, one nation under God, indivisible, by which all men are free and righteous."

=== Chinese media commentary ===
The passage of China's Anti-Secession Law was acclaimed by the media within the People's Republic of China, especially when Premier Wen Jiabao mentioned at a press conference that the law was modeled on the U.S. unification law, and was widely praised by public opinion. Major Chinese media at the time widely publicized and quoted the purported U.S. Anti-Secession Act. Outside the official media, Chinese academic papers have been published comparing the differences between the Chinese and U.S. anti-secession acts.

Journal San Wa Ou, a pro-Beijing newspaper in Macau, praised the Anti-Secession Law, characterizing both the new Chinese law and the supposed U.S. law as instruments of justice, and praised the wording of the translation. The commentary states, "When the Chinese government introduced the Anti-Secession Law to the U.S. government, it translated '分裂' as 'Secession,' which is the same as secession and treason in the American Civil War, highlighting the fact that China's Anti-Secession Law is the same sword of justice as the Anti-Secession Federal act in the glorious history of the Civil War between the south and the north."

Apple Daily pointed out that Wen brought up two anti-secession resolutions of the United States of 1861, the Anti-Secession Act (Anti-Secession Resolutions of the New York Legislature, 1861) and the East Tennessee Anti-Secession Resolutions. The coverage also explained the passage of this resolution by the New York State Assembly:

In a press conference, Chinese Premier Wen Jiabao cited the emergence of two "anti-secession laws" in the United States before the Civil War as an excuse for China's anti-secession law. Wang Zhaoguo, vice chairman of the Chinese National People's Congress (NPC), pointed out earlier that the legal title and English translation of the bill are identical to the Anti-Secession Act (Anti-Secession Resolutions of the New York Legislature - 1861), which was enacted before the American Civil War. This resolution was passed by the New York State Legislature in January 1861 in response to attacks and occupations of federal government units in South Carolina, Georgia, Alabama, and Louisiana.

In 2021, Zhou Suyuan, a professor of history at Wuhan University, positively affirmed that the United States enacted the Anti-Secession Act and ultimately preserved the unity of the United States by limiting the secession of the Confederate States by Southern slaveholders.

Initium Media found that the most similar documented U.S. law is the earlier Insurrection Act. Intuit pointed to a lengthy essay in the 2005 issue of the Chinese journal "Comparative Study on Anti-Secession Law Between China and USA", which does not actually cite text of the purported U.S. anti-secession law at all. Columnist Shi Qingye argues that borrowing from U.S. law cannot solve China's narrative dilemma in backing unification, and that the answer might be found in the abdication edict of the Qing Dynasty.

== See also ==
- Texas v. White, an 1869 U.S. Supreme Court decision establishing that it had been illegal under the U.S. Constitution in 1861 for states to secede unilaterally
