= Society of Publishers in Asia =

The Society of Publishers in Asia
- 亞洲出版業協會
- Abbreviation: SOPA
- Formation: 1982
- Type: Non-profit organization
- Headquarters: Hong Kong
- Region served: Asia-Pacific
- Chair: Byron Perry
- Board of directors: Jasper Chung, Julia Clyne, Desiree Au, Barrett Bingley, Lyn-Yi Chung, Juliet Labog-Javellana, Adrian Lee, Danielle McGuigan, Peter Murray, Sunita Rajan
- Website: sopasia.com

The Society of Publishers in Asia (SOPA) is a non-profit organization founded in 1982 in Hong Kong. It aims to promote press freedom, recognize excellence in journalism, and support publishing professionalism in the Asia-Pacific region. SOPA represents the interests of media organizations across the region.

The organization is best known for organizing the annual SOPA Awards for Editorial Excellence, one of the most prominent journalism awards in the Asia-Pacific.

== SOPA Awards for Editorial Excellence ==
Since 1999, SOPA has presented the SOPA Awards for Editorial Excellence annually. The awards recognize outstanding journalism in both traditional and digital media across the Asia-Pacific region.

The awards are widely regarded as one of the most influential journalism prizes in the region.

== Members ==
=== Hong Kong ===
- South China Morning Post
- Coconuts Media

=== Singapore ===
- Initium Media
- Channel NewsAsia

=== Mainland China ===
- The Paper
- Sixth Tone
- Trends Group

=== Taiwan ===
- United Daily News
- Business Today
- Commonwealth Magazine
- Mirror Media
- Taiwan News
- Storm Media

=== United States ===
- Dow Jones & Company
- Bloomberg L.P.
- The New York Times
- Bloomberg Businessweek
- Vogue (magazine)
- PRovoke Media

=== United Kingdom ===
- Financial Times
- Reuters
- The Economist

=== Japan ===
- Nikkei Asia

=== Philippines ===
- Philippine Daily Inquirer

== Associate members ==
- Google News Initiative
- Piano.io

== Former members ==
=== Hong Kong ===
- Apple Daily (Hong Kong)
- Ming Pao
- Hong Kong Living

=== Singapore ===
- DestinAsian

=== Mainland China ===
- DataVis
- TechNode

=== Myanmar ===
- The Myanmar Times

== Former associate members ==
- Facebook
- Hongkong Post
- PR Newswire
- Media OutReach
