= Anti-Secession Law =

2005 Chinese legislation authorizing military force for unification with Taiwan

- National Emblem of the People's Republic of China

National People's Congress
- Enacted by: National People's Congress
- Enacted: March 14, 2005
- Signed by: President Hu Jintao
- Commenced: March 14, 2005

Legislative history
- Introduced by: Standing Committee of the National People's Congress
- First reading: 25–29 December 2004
- Second reading: 5–14 March 2005
- Voting summary: 2,896 voted for; None voted against; 2 abstained

Summary
- A Law formulated in accordance with the Constitution, for the purpose of opposing and checking Taiwan's secession from China by secessionists in the name of "Taiwan independence", promoting peaceful national reunification, maintaining peace and stability in the Taiwan Straits, preserving China's sovereignty and territorial integrity, and safeguarding the fundamental interests of the Chinese nation.

Keywords
- National Security, Secession, Taiwan
- Status: In force

Anti-Secession Law
- Simplified Chinese: 反分裂国家法
- Traditional Chinese: 反分裂國家法
Transcriptions
Standard Mandarin
- Hanyu Pinyin: Fǎn-Fēnliè Guójiā Fǎ
- Wade–Giles: Fan3-Fên1-lieh4 Kuo2-chia1 Fa3

The Anti-Secession Law is a law of the People's Republic of China, passed by the 3rd Session of the 10th National People's Congress. It was ratified on March 14, 2005, and went into effect immediately. Although the law, at ten articles, is relatively short, Article 8 formalized the long-standing policy of the PRC to use military means against Taiwan independence in the event peaceful means become impossible.

== Background ==
The re-election of Chen Shui-bian of the Democratic Progressive Party (DPP) to the Taiwanese presidency, led many to conclude that there has been an increase in Taiwan independence sentiment and that a new Taiwanese identity is emerging on the island which is opposed to identification with China. During the 2004 Taiwanese Legislative Election, the strategy of the pan-Green coalition was to try to capitalize on this trend to win a majority in the Legislative Yuan of Taiwan. Among some Taiwanese Independence supporters, it is believed that a pan-green majority could force a crucial referendum for constitutional reform and, perhaps, to further move the island toward de jure independence. Many Taiwanese independence supporters, including former President Lee Teng-Hui, argued that Taiwan should declare independence before 2008 on the theory that international pressure over the Beijing Olympics would prevent the PRC from using force against Taiwan.

These events in late 2004 caused a great deal of alarm in Beijing. Observers indicated that many in Beijing believed that its policies toward Taiwan had failed both because it did not have sufficient incentives to gain Taiwanese public support for unification and at the same time, it seemed that many in Taiwan did not take Beijing's stated threats of force seriously. The Taiwanese government had defined the status quo in such a way that a de jure declaration of independence could be argued to not represent a change in the status quo. Some Chinese believe these events led to the formulation in 2003 and 2004 of the Anti-Secession Law.

In a string of unsuccessful efforts to change Taiwanese public opinion, several propositions and leaks from PRC governmental organs expressed consideration for a law aiming to formalize the policy for Chinese unification between mainland China and Taiwan under the authority of the PRC. This culminated in May 2004, when Premier Wen Jiabao pronounced to a group of Chinese expatriates in London that serious consideration of such a law would be taken. Several days later, Yu's suggestion (similar to a green paper) emerged.

In early 2004, Yu Yuanzhou (余元洲), a professor from Jianghan University in Wuhan who did not hold any formal governmental position, proposed a law titled the National Unification Promotion Law of the People's Republic of China (中华人民共和国国家统一促进法), as a suggestion to create a formal legal basis for the People's Republic of China's unification with Taiwan. The draft document has 31 articles, organized in 8 chapters. Its provisions touch mostly constitutional law. Article 2 of the proposal would establish Taiwan as the "Taiwan Special Political Area of PRC, or Taiwan SPA of PRC for short" (simplified Chinese: 中华人民共和国台湾特别政治区; traditional Chinese: 中華人民共和國台灣特別政治區). Although no formal legislative action was taken on the document, the heavy debate surrounding it, and the suggestion that some sort of anti-secession law would be passed, was viewed by many in Taiwan as evidence of hostile intent by the PRC government towards Taiwan independence supporters.

The ROC President Chen Shui-bian expressed serious concerns about this proposal and doubts that the Taiwanese public would find it acceptable. Chen pointed out that the law being proposed is mostly intended as a measure to legitimize the PRC's military threats against the ROC. Furthermore, the proposed law would incriminate anyone holding opinions other than those supporting PRC policy on the question of unification. Under the law dissidents would be prosecuted under charges of treason, retroactively effective up to 100 years, raising serious questions about freedom of speech and civil liberties. Chen stated that the law would only serve to increase the feelings of animosity of the Taiwanese people towards the PRC and increase tensions.

In the December 2004 Taiwanese legislative election, although the ruling DPP party increased its share of votes in the legislature and remained the largest single party there, the Pan-Blue Coalition gained a razor-thin majority, which surprised many. However, this result may have been less a reflection of popular sentiment than a testament to the effectiveness of the KMT's more frugal nomination of candidates (116) compared with the DPP's over-nomination of candidates (122) and the KMT's rigid party rules for allotment of votes to its candidates within individual districts. This election result ended most prospects of an immediate declaration of independence and also called into question whether there really had been an increase in Taiwanese independence sentiment. Despite this, the PRC proceeded with the drafting of the anti-secession law. The main reasons given to foreign interlocutors were that the PRC leadership believed that its Taiwan policy in the past had been reactive rather than proactive and that it was necessary for the PRC to show initiative. Furthermore, Beijing expressed a residual distrust of Chen Shui-bian. Many foreign experts have argued that the PRC's decision-making system was rigid and that plans put into place to deal with a pan-green victory had simply developed too much momentum to be shut down.

== Legislative history ==
In December 2003, General Secretary Hu Jintao instructed the NPC to create a "special legislation on Taiwan". At an internal meeting of the NPCSC's Party members, NPCSC Chairman Wu Bangguo said that the legislature must expedite Taiwan legislation because "[t]he possibility of major 'Taiwan independence' incidents during [Taiwan's] 'constitutional reform' process cannot be ruled out." In December 2004, the Standing Committee of the 10th National People's Congress announced that it would review the draft Anti-Secession Law and subsequently decided to submit it to the National People's Congress for deliberation. In announcing the drafting of the law in December 2004, the Head of the Legislative Affairs Commission of the Standing Committee of the National People's Congress mentioned explicitly that the law was not intended to be applied to Hong Kong and Macau.

The name of such a law targeting Taiwan was determined after a long period of deliberation. The earliest name proposed was "Unification Law", followed by "Taiwan Basic Law" and "Anti-Secession Law". The name of the law was finally decided to be "Anti-Secession Law", mainly to reflect the view of the Chinese government on the current situation across the Taiwan Strait, that is, the two sides of the Taiwan Strait are currently in a state of division (i.e., the power of governance is not unified), but not split (i.e., the sovereignty is not unified), and the purpose of the new law is to avoid the division of China. The final draft law is also limited to Taiwan, and does not involve Hong Kong, Macau, Tibet and Xinjiang. The name of this law is not preceded by "People's Republic of China", which may be related to the current status and negotiability of the "China" situation across the Taiwan Strait, and does not lose its effectiveness due to these issues.

On 14 March 2005, the last item on the agenda of the third session of the 10th National People's Congress was a vote on the Anti-Secession Law. The final result was a vote of 2,896 in favor, 0 against, 2 abstentions, and 3 people not pressing the voting machine. On the same day, President Hu Jintao signed Presidential Order No. 34, announcing the official promulgation of the law, which took effect from that day.

== Provisions ==
The Anti-Secession Law has a total of 10 articles. The law first states that "there is only one China in the world. The mainland and Taiwan belong to one China. China's sovereignty and territorial integrity cannot be divided. Maintaining national sovereignty and territorial integrity is the common obligation of all Chinese people, including our compatriots in Taiwan." Article 3 of the law defines the Taiwan issue as "a legacy of China's civil war" and therefore an internal affair of China that is not subject to interference by foreign forces.

Article 5 states that the one-China principle is the basis for peaceful reunification, and promises that after peaceful reunification, Taiwan will "be able to implement a system different from that of the mainland and a high degree of autonomy". Article 6 requires the government to promote cross-strait personnel exchanges, encourage and promote economic cooperation and direct three links, encourage and promote exchanges in education, science and technology, culture, health, sports and other fields, and jointly promote Chinese culture and protect the rights and interests of Taiwan compatriots in accordance with the law. Article 7 advocates the peaceful resolution of cross-strait issues through consultation and proposes that the two sides can negotiate in six areas, including ending the state of hostility, the political status of the Taiwan authorities, and the international space of Taiwan.

The most notable Article 8 states that the government may take "non-peaceful means and other necessary measures to safeguard national sovereignty and territorial integrity" in three situations. These three situations are:

1. The fact that Taiwan split from China;
2. A major incident occurs that would lead to Taiwan's separation from China;
3. The possibility of peaceful reunification is completely lost.

The outside world has focused on the last of the three conditions, namely, "the possibility of peaceful reunification is completely lost", which is considered to be a condition that can be interpreted very flexibly. In addition, Article 8 also allows the State Council and the Central Military Commission to take action first when necessary and then report to the Standing Committee of the National People's Congress. It is considered to authorize the State Council and the Central Military Commission to act first and report later. Article 9 requires that when "non-peaceful means and other necessary measures are taken", the state will do its utmost to "protect the lives, property and other legitimate rights and interests of Taiwan civilians and foreigners in Taiwan, and reduce losses; at the same time, the state will protect the rights and interests of Taiwan compatriots in other parts of China in accordance with the law."

== Reactions ==
=== Hong Kong ===
At the time the unification law was proposed by legal scholar Yu Yuanzhou, the press in Hong Kong expressed concern that it would lead to legislation by stealth of the anti-treason or anti-secession provision of the Basic Law Article 23 legislation in 2003. These concerns were addressed when a mainland China official stated explicitly the law would not be added to Annex III of the Basic Law, which means that it would not be applicable to Hong Kong. After the passage of the law in March 2005, there was very little reaction in Hong Kong and news of the law was far overshadowed by the resignation of Hong Kong's chief executive, Tung Chee-hwa. In the 15 years since the law was passed, it has cast a long shadow over Hong Kong.

=== Taiwan ===
In a rare moment of agreement, politicians in Taiwan from both the Pan-green coalition and Pan-blue coalition reacted negatively towards the Anti-Secession Law. Some politicians have proposed that the Republic of China (ROC) enact an "anti-annexation law" to counter the proposed PRC law. Various opinion polls have revealed that 80% of Taiwan residents oppose such an "anti-secession law" and a majority agree that a defensive referendum should be held in the advance of such a law to protect the status quo.

President Chen Shui-bian commented on the "anti-secession law" during his 2005 new year speech: "Such actions will not only unilaterally change the status quo of peace in the Taiwan Strait, but will also pose the greatest threat to regional stability and world peace." Whereas the President Hu Jintao said "We will definitely not allow anyone to separate Taiwan from China by any means," in his New Year's Eve speech.

Although the PRC's official English translation of the law is the Anti-Secession Law, the Mainland Affairs Council in Taiwan has consistently translated it as Anti-Separation Law as secession implies that Taiwan is a part of the PRC. The Mainland Affairs Council and the ROC government has argued that the relationship across the Taiwan Strait is not analogous to the situation during the American Civil War since Taiwan was never part of the PRC.

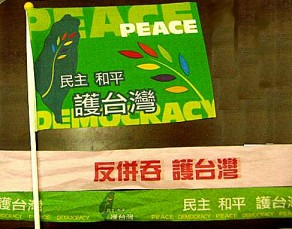
A rally flag used in the 3-26 protests. Word on the flag reads:"democracy, peace, guard Taiwan", while the ribbon below writes "anti annexation, guard Taiwan".

In Taiwan, the passage of the law was condemned by officials and politicians from both the Pan-Green Coalition and the Pan-Blue Coalition, although there were differences in the content of their criticism. Supporters of the Pan-Green Coalition tended to react angrily to the spirit and content of the law as an infringement of what they saw as Taiwanese sovereignty. By contrast, supporters of the Pan-Blue Coalition, while stating that they opposed the law and the threat of force against Taiwan, called for more dialogue with the PRC and pointed to parts of the law in which Beijing showed hitherto unseen flexibility.

Opinion polls indicated widespread opposition to the law among the general public. Some questioned whether Beijing had the authority to enact such a law as they claim that Taiwan is not under the PRC jurisdiction (See Political status of Taiwan). The Pan-Green Coalition, in particular, reacted with distaste and there have been calls for an "anti-annexation law" to be passed by the legislature. Premier Frank Hsieh pointed out that the PRC law had already infringed on ROC sovereignty and thus met the criteria for initiating a "defensive referendum" under the ROC constitution. However, he added that whether a defensive referendum would be invoked is at the discretion of the ROC president.

On March 25, 2008, DPP legislators tabled a bill titled the "Anti-Annexation Peace Law" at the procedural committee level in the legislature, which would have stated that "Taiwan and China are not subordinate to each other"; that "Taiwan is a sovereign state"; and that "the relationship between Taiwan and China is one between two states". It would have expressed hope that the Taiwan issue be resolved peacefully, but that if the status quo of the Taiwan Strait should change, the President would have the power to deal non-peacefully with "China's annexation". The bill was rejected at the procedural committee level by a vote of 11:2 and was not presented to the legislature.

=== International reactions ===
United States Secretary of State Condoleezza Rice commented that the law was "not necessary", while White House spokesman Scott McClellan called its adoption "unfortunate", adding "It does not serve the purpose of peace and stability in the Taiwan Strait". In speaking about the law, the United States repeated that it remained supportive of the One China policy as the US defines it, that it did not support Taiwan independence, and opposed any unilateral action to change the status quo. The United States House of Representatives approved a resolution criticizing the PRC for the approval of the PRC law in Beijing. The resolution expressed grave concern about the law and said the PRC law provides a legal justification for PRC to use force against Taiwan, in its words, altering the status quo in the region.

In response to the enactment of the PRC law, the European Union issued a statement urging "all sides to avoid any unilateral action that could stoke tensions," and recalled the "constant principles that guide its policy, namely its commitment to the principle of one China and the peaceful resolution of dispute...and its opposition to any use of force." Later, on 14 April 2005, the European Parliament adopted an own-initiative report by Elmar Brok MEP, with paragraph 33 stating:

[The European Parliament expresses] its deepest concern at the large number of missiles in southern China aimed across the Taiwan Straits and at the so-called "anti-secession law" of the People's Republic of China that in an unjustified way aggravates the situation across the Straits; calls on the People's Republic of China and on the R.O.C. in Taiwan to resume political talks on the basis of mutual understanding and recognition in order to promote stability, democracy, human rights and the rule of law in east Asia.

Australian foreign minister Alexander Downer stated that if war were to occur in the Taiwan Straits, Australia would be required under the ANZUS treaty to consult with the United States but depending on the situation that it would not necessarily commit Australia to war. He said that "we don't think that the PRC should resolve the Taiwan status question militarily, that it has got to be done through negotiations with Taiwan". Downer further commented that Australia would have preferred it had China not passed the anti-secession law.

Some academics have cited the Anti-Secession Law as a prime example of lawfare.

== Aftermath ==
In 2024, the PRC issued the Guidelines on Imposing Criminal Punishments on Diehard "Taiwan independence" Separatists for Conducting or Inciting Secession, based partially on the Anti-Secession Law, stating that supporters of Taiwanese independence, regardless of their location, could be tried in absentia and sentenced to death by Chinese courts.

== See also ==
- Canadian Bill C-20
- Chinese unification
- Law on Promoting Ethnic Unity and Progress
- New York Anti-Secession Ordinance, a non-binding New York state resolution characterized in Chinese media as a federal U.S. anti-secession law
- Political status of Taiwan
- Secession
- "Taiwan, China"
- Taiwan independence
- Taiwan Province, People's Republic of China; Taiwan (Republic of China province)
- Taiwan Relations Act
