= Tyrone Siu =

Reuters photojournalist

- Born: Hong Kong
- Occupation: Photojournalist
- Employer: Reuters
- Awards: Reuters Photographer of the Year (2019); Pulitzer Prize for Breaking News Photography (2020, Reuters staff); Pictures of the Year International (POYi) – Spot News First Place (2026)

Tyrone Siu (Chinese: 蕭文超) is a Hong Kong photojournalist employed by Reuters.

== Career ==
Siu joined Reuters in 2009 and is based in Hong Kong. He has a master's degree from the Chinese University of Hong Kong.

As a Reuters staff photographer, Siu covers major international news events, with a focus on Asia and global crises.

Siu documented the Umbrella Movement (also known as the 2014 Hong Kong protests) and the 2019–2020 Hong Kong protests. His work contributed to Reuters winning the 2020 Pulitzer Prize for Breaking News Photography. In a Reuters Wider Image feature reflecting on the award, Siu described covering the events as intensely personal as a Hong Kong native and graduate of the Chinese University of Hong Kong, where his alma mater became a battleground. He emphasized maintaining calm amid chaos to fulfill his duties, including assisting foreign colleagues, and noted the lasting emotional impact of images such as a detained woman's face and repeated scenes of young protesters being arrested.

In November 2025, Siu photographed the fire at Wang Fuk Court in Tai Po, Hong Kong. One of his images, depicting a grieving resident, was widely published and became a symbol of the disaster. It was selected for multiple international year-end photography collections, including The Guardian's "The photographs that defined 2025", where he recounted arriving about an hour after the fire began on 26 November, witnessing the resident's frantic grief, and later reconnecting with the family to reflect on the enduring meaning of "home" despite the loss. A Reuters special report further detailed his account of capturing the moment of desperation and its universal emotional impact.

Siu won first place in the Spot News category of the 83rd Pictures of the Year International (POYi) awards for his photograph "Desperate Plea Amid Hong Kong's Deadliest Fire" from the Wang Fuk Court fire.

Siu has discussed photojournalism ethics, including decisions not to photograph certain sensitive scenes during Hong Kong's COVID-19 pandemic, in a 2023 lecture at the World Press Photo Exhibition in Hong Kong.
