= Civil defense in Taiwan =

Civil defense in Taiwan traces its modern roots to the Japanese colonial period and has recently seen a resurgence due to the increasing threat from China following the Russian invasion of Ukraine. Taiwan has a large network of air raid shelters. In the modern era civil defense includes both governmental and non-governmental organizations. Prominent non-governmental organizations include Kuma Academy and the Forward Alliance. In addition, recent years have seen the creation of numerous local organizations such as Taiwan Hemlock Defense (台灣鐵杉民防), Taiwan Militia Association (台灣民團協會) or Academia Formosana. Watchout has also been instrumental in the introduction of civil defense manuals from other countries.

== History ==
Organized civil defense in Taiwan began during the Japanese colonial period. After taking over in 1945, the Chinese Nationalist government inaugurated the Taiwan Province Air Defense Command. This organization was primarily responsible for organizing air defense and evacuation. In 1949, it was renamed to the Taiwan Province Civil Defense Command. In 1973 the responsibility for civil defense shifted from the Ministry of Defense to the Ministry of the Interior with the National Police Agency taking over the civil defense infrastructure.

In 2022, Taiwanese civil defense units had 420,000 registered volunteers.

In 2023 training shifted to more of a wartime focus with 70% of exercises dedicated to wartime scenarios and 30% of exercises dedicated to natural disaster scenarios. It had previously been a 50–50 split.

In 2024 the Whole-of-Society Defense Resilience Committee was inaugurated. The committee's purpose is to organize and standardize civil defense efforts across Taiwan taking a whole-of-society approach to the problem. The committee held their first tabletop exercise in December 2024 and their first physical exercise in March 2025. The March exercise involved 1,500 people and was overseen by Taiwanese President William Lai. The National Climate Change Response Committee and the Healthy Taiwan Promotion Committee which were launched around the same period can be seen as other initiatives to enhance national security and social resilience.

Civil defense organizations in Taiwan have been inspired by Ukrainian resistance to Russian invasion and have incorporated lessons learned in Ukraine into their own training.

In July 2026, Taiwan announced that it would deliberately slow mobile internet service during annual civil-defence drills in August, marking the first such test in the country. The 30-minute exercises were planned for 14 cities and counties in northern and central Taiwan, covering areas containing about 70% of the population, while essential services such as emergency calls, traffic signals and automated teller machines would remain unaffected.

== Government organizations ==
The Civil Defense Act legislates the creation of civil defense units at four levels: city and county, district and township, state-run companies, and large companies, factories and schools.

The Ministry of Agriculture (Taiwan) is tasked with ensuring many aspects of Taiwan's food security, this includes ensuring a legally mandated three month supply of rice. Reserve food supplies are dispered around the country to make attacking them more difficult. The Taiwan Agricultural Research institute maintains a "doomsday bunker" hardened against military attack which houses samples of all crops grown in Taiwan.

Military and civil defense training has been integrated into Taiwan's high school curriculum for a long time. It has received increased emphasis. In 2023 a high school in Kaohsiung opened an air rifle and pistol shooting range as part of their total defense program. The military runs combat training camps for high school students during school breaks.

The All-Out Defense Mobilization Agency was created in 2021 to organize Taiwan's total defense strategy It was created through the merger of the All-out Defense Mobilization Office and the Armed Forces Reserve Command.

In 2023 the Ministry of Defense and Ministry of Health and Welfare (Taiwan) set up a reserve system for medical personnel.

The government has designated over 5,000 sites at which essential supplies will be distributed in the event of an emergency.

== Private organizations ==
=== Kuma Academy ===
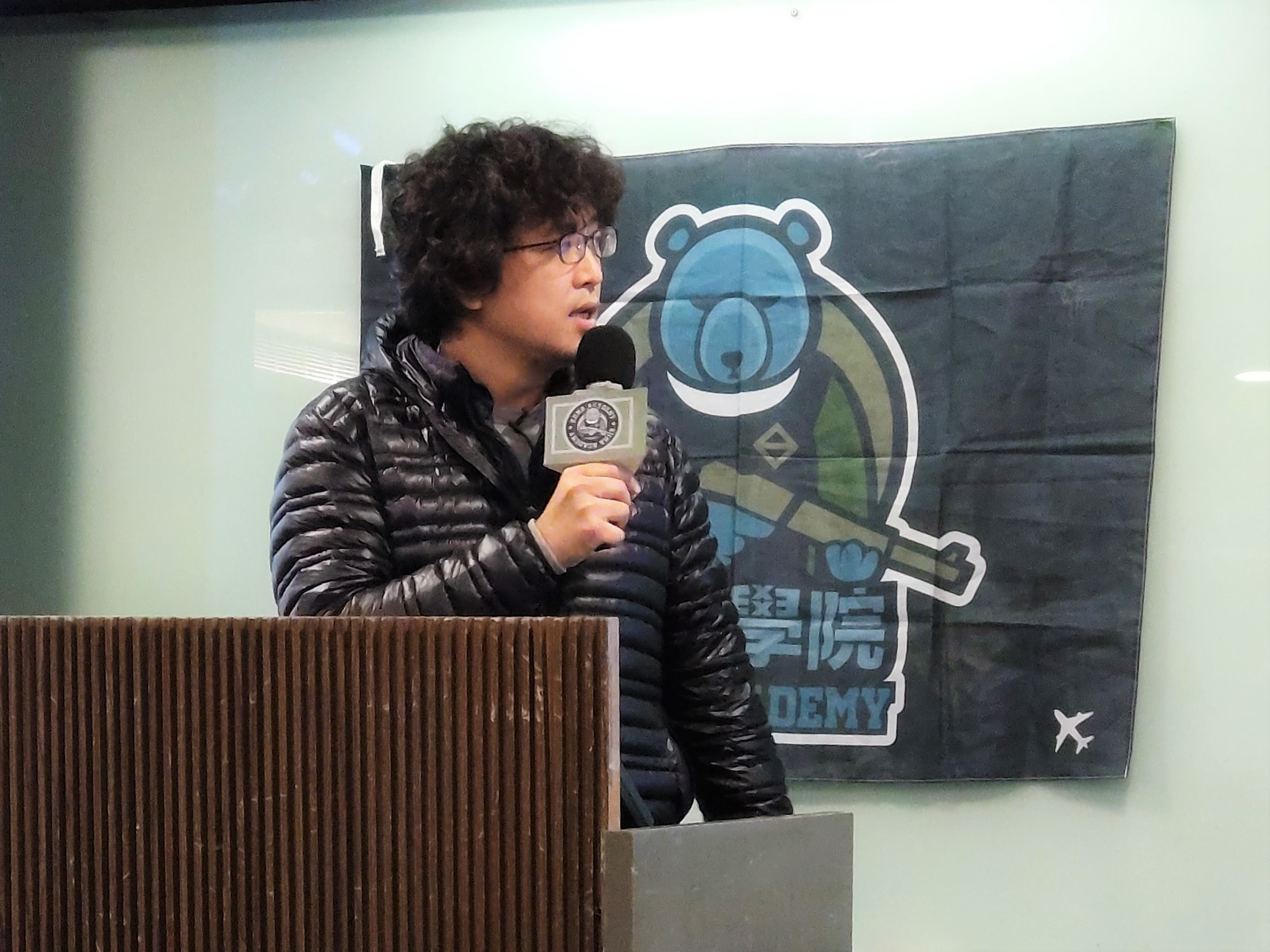
Puma Shen at a lecture held by Kuma Academy

Kuma Academy provides civil defense training to civilians in Taiwan. Classes cover topics like first aid and media literacy (intended to combat disinformation from China). Kuma Academy has also provided training in open-source intelligence and cybersecurity. According to Kuma, their goal is "to decentralise civil defence."

=== Forward Alliance ===
The Forward Alliance is a Taiwanese national security and civil defense think tank. The group runs workshops to train civilians in disaster response and civil defense. Following the beginning of the 2022 Russian invasion of Ukraine, public participation in training programs run by the Forward Alliance increased greatly.

=== Airsoft groups ===
Due to strict firearms regulation in Taiwan many civilians and reservists rely on airsoft to build and maintain firearms associated muscle memory and tactical skills. Interest in airsoft groups and associated training increased following the Russian invasion of Ukraine.

== Shelters ==
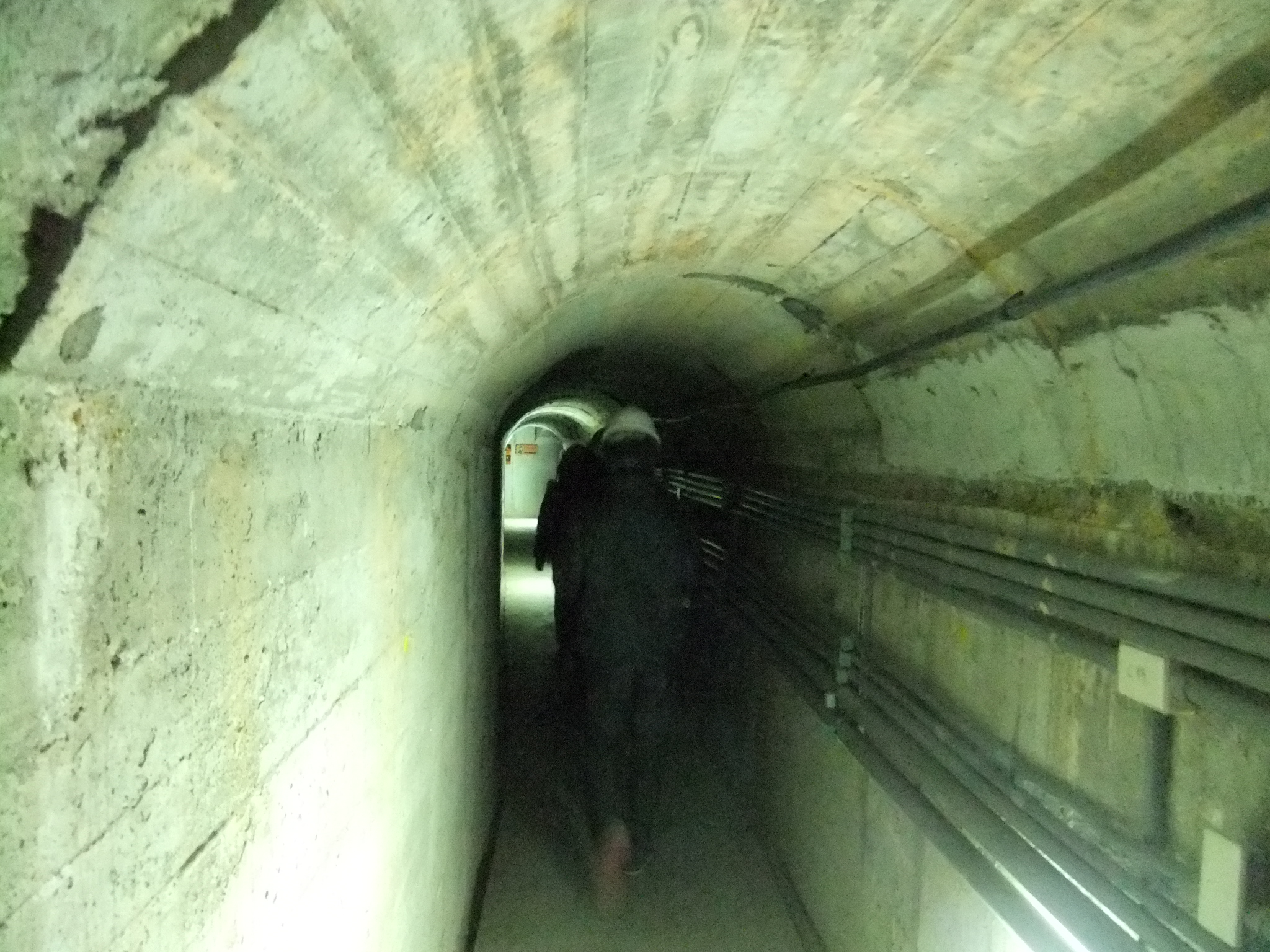
Jincheng Civil Defense Tunnel

There are more than 117,000 air raid shelters in Taiwan, some dating back to the Japanese colonial period. During the Second World War an extensive network of bunkers and shelters was built across Taiwan to defend against allied bombing raids. Many more obsolete shelters as well as military bunkers have been repurposed as commercial, artistic, or public buildings.

== Publications ==
The Taiwanese government publishes a civil defense handbook. An updated version was published in 2023.

In 2023 Canadian expat John Groot published Resilience Roadmap: An Emergency Preparedness Guide for Expats in Taiwan which focuses on civil defense from the perspective of a non-Taiwanese living in Taiwan. A second edition was released in 2025. This second edition was also made available as a free ebook.

The Ministry of National Defense printed 11 million copies of the 2025 version of the civil defense handbook.

== See also ==
- Jincheng Civil Defense Tunnel
- Qionglin Tunnel
- Total defence
- Total Defence (Singapore)
