= Civilian War Memorial =

Monument in Singapore

Memorial to the Civilian Victims of the Japanese Occupation 1942 – 1945
- 日本占领时期死难人民纪念碑 (Chinese); Tugu Peringatan Bagi Mangsa Awam Pemerintahan Jepun (Malay) ஜப்பானியர் ஆதிக்க காலத்தில் உயிர் துறந்த பொதுமக்களுக்கன நினைவுச் சின்னம் (Tamil) 日本占領の民間人犠牲者を追悼 (Japanese); 1942 – 1945
- Singapore Chinese Chamber of Commerce and Industry
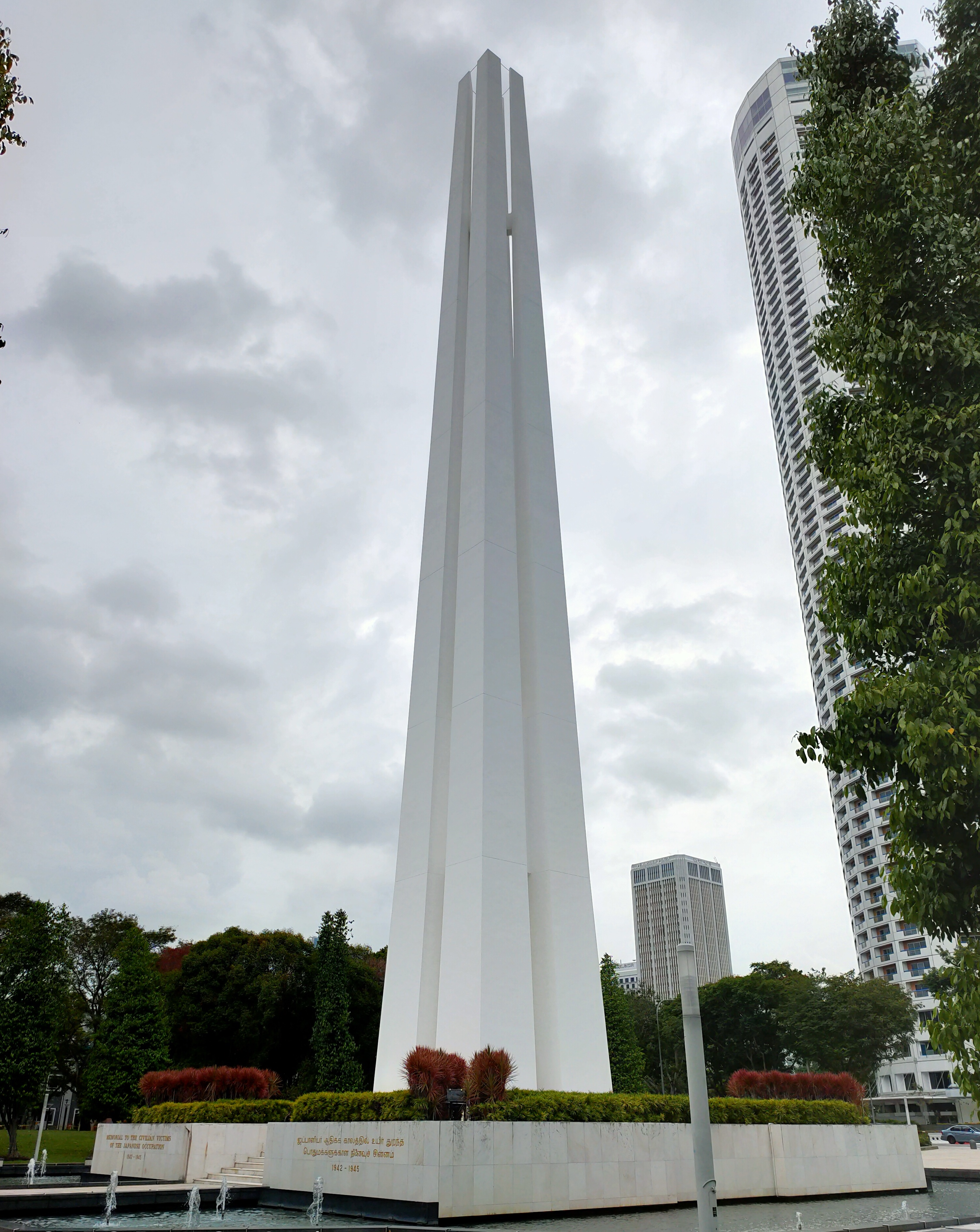
- Civilian War Memorial, Singapore
- For civilian victims of the Japanese occupation of Singapore (1942–1945)
- Established: 15 June 1963; 63 years ago
- Unveiled: 15 February 1967; 59 years ago
- Location: 1°17′34.58″N 103°51′17.42″E; War Memorial Park, Singapore near Padang and City Hall
- Designed by: Leong Swee Lim of Swan & Maclaren Architects
- Total burials: 606 urns containing the remains of thousands of unknown civilians
- In deep and lasting sorrow this memorial is dedicated in memory of those of our civilians who were killed between February 15, 1942 and August 18, 1945 when the Japanese Armed Forces occupied Singapore

National monument of Singapore
- Designated: 15 August 2013; 13 years ago
- Reference no.: 65

The Memorial to the Civilian Victims of the Japanese Occupation, usually called the Civilian War Memorial, (Note: Chinese: 日本占领时期死难人民纪念碑; Malay: Tugu Peringatan Bagi Mangsa Awam Pemerintahan Jepun; Tamil: ஜப்பானியர் ஆதிக்க காலத்தில் உயிர் துறந்த பொதுமக்களுக்கன நினைவுச் சின்னம்) is a war memorial and heritage landmark in Singapore built in memory of the civilians killed during the Japanese occupation of Singapore during World War II. The Civilian War Memorial sits on serene parkland in the midst of busy city traffic near Singapore's Padang and the City Hall, and next to Esplanade MRT station. Located within the War Memorial Park at Beach Road within the Central Area, Singapore's central business district, it is usually easy to spot in most backdrops encompassing the CBD landscape. It was gazetted as the 65th national memorial on 15 August 2013.

== History ==
During the Empire of Japan's occupation of Singapore during the Pacific War (1942–1945), thousands of ethnic Chinese were killed in the Sook Ching massacre. In an effort to remove anti-Japanese elements in Singapore, Chinese men between the ages of 18 and 50 were to report to the Kempeitai, the Imperial Japanese Army military police. The death toll was reported to be 6,000 by the Japanese, but official estimates range between 25,000 and 50,000.

In February 1962, remains belonging to civilian victims of the Japanese occupation were unearthed in areas like Siglap, Changi and Bukit Timah. The Singapore Chinese Chamber of Commerce and Industry (SCCC) undertook the responsibility of gathering the remains and creating a memorial.

=== The Civilian War Memorial project ===
On 13 March 1963, Prime Minister Lee Kuan Yew set aside a plot of land at Beach Road for the building of a memorial dedicated to the civilians killed in World War II. The SCCC set up a fund committee that was later enlarged to include all ethnic groups due to good response from the community. With the support of the Government and contributions from the public, construction of the memorial was able to start.

=== Architecture ===
The design of the memorial was conceived by Leong Swee Lim of Swan & Maclaren Architects for whom it won first prize in an open design competition in that month. The design was one of Leong's most famous and significant contributions towards Singapore's architecture. The four identical pillars, each 70 metres (230 ft) high, represent the shared experiences and unity of the four major races of Singapore: Chinese, Eurasian, Indian and Malay.

=== Ground-breaking ceremony ===
On 15 June 1963, Lee Kuan Yew performed the ground-breaking ceremony of "turning (or breaking) the sod" to lay the foundation for the memorial witnessed by a gathering of representatives from the Inter-Religious Organisation and members of the consular corps. Construction of the memorial began on 23 April 1966.

A ceremony was held on 1 November that year before the completion of the memorial, which saw 606 urns containing the remains of thousands of unknown civilians from the mass graves interred on either side of the memorial podium, added to the material significance of the structure whose history it represents.

== Unveiling of the Memorial ==
The memorial was completed in January 1967 at a total construction cost of about S$500,000. On February 15 that year, the Civilian War Memorial was officially unveiled by then Prime Minister Lee Kuan Yew, who laid a wreath at the memorial.

The memorial is considered one of Singapore's iconic heritage landmarks that supports virtues of a multiracial and multicultural city, the unity of which is also inevitably considered as one of the pillars for Singapore's modern day state. The memorial has also been described by some as resembling four giant chopsticks.

Every year on 15 February (Total Defence Day in Singapore, commemorating the 1942 surrender of Singapore to the Japanese), a memorial service is held at the Civilian War Memorial to remember the victims of the war. "Auld Lang Syne", written by Robert Burns, is sung during the memorial service at the Civilian War Memorial to remember the victims of the war.

== National monument ==
On 15 August 2013, the Civilian War Memorial was gazetted by the National Heritage Board as the 65th National monument of Singapore.

== Gallery ==
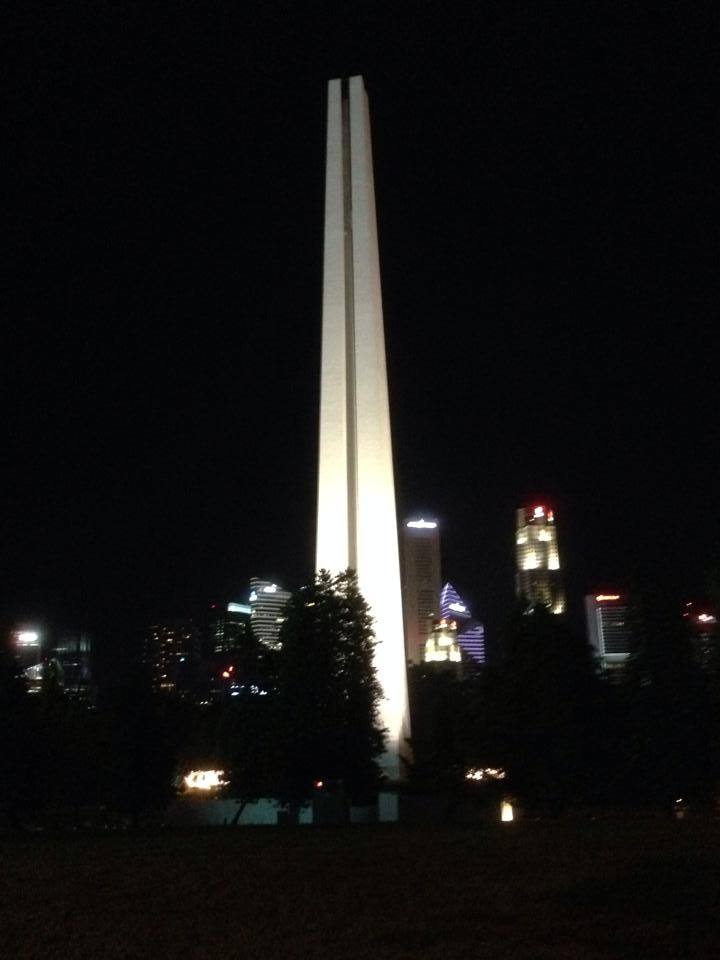
The Civilian War Memorial lit up at night

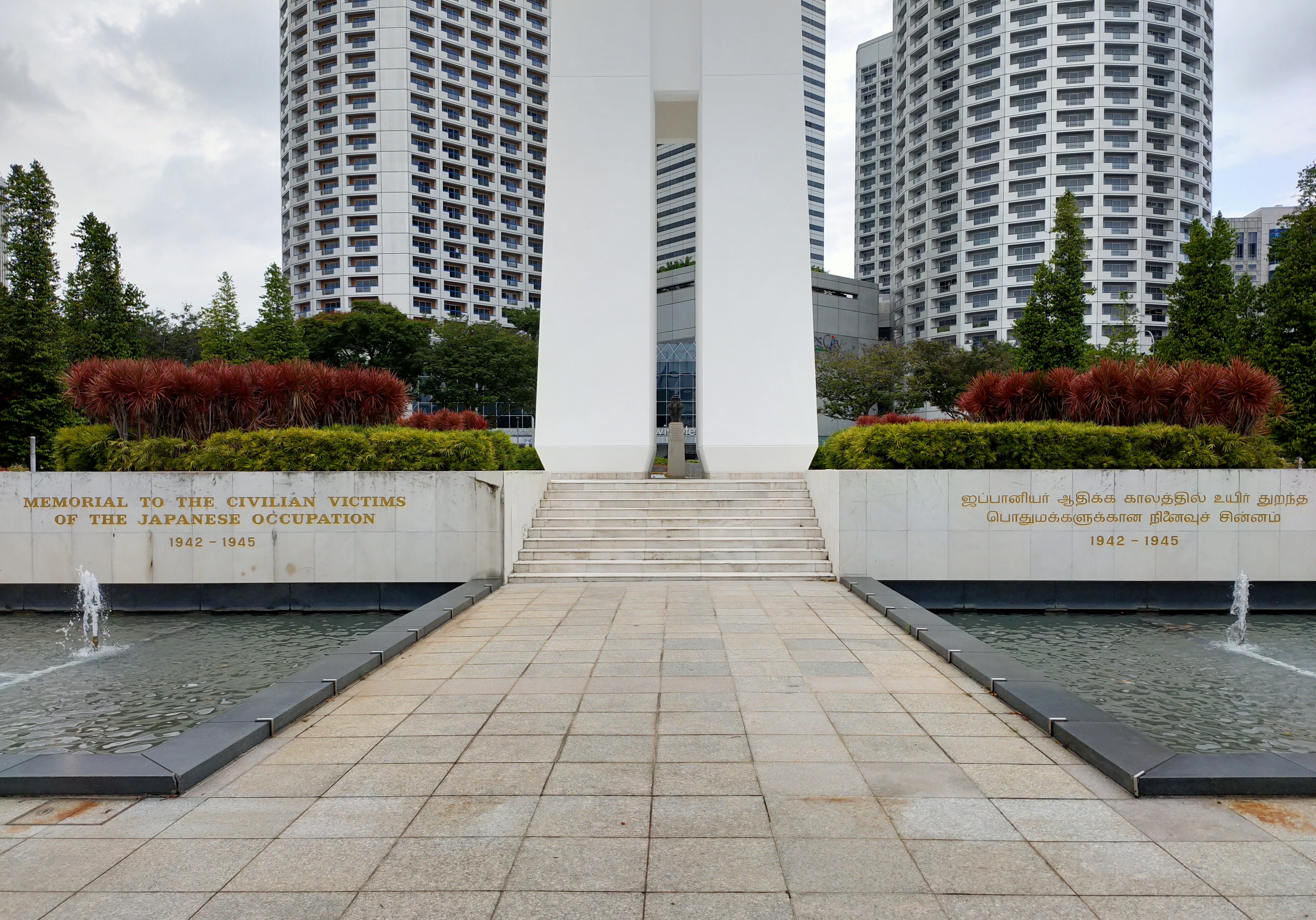
Pedestal of the memorial with inscriptions written in English and Tamil.

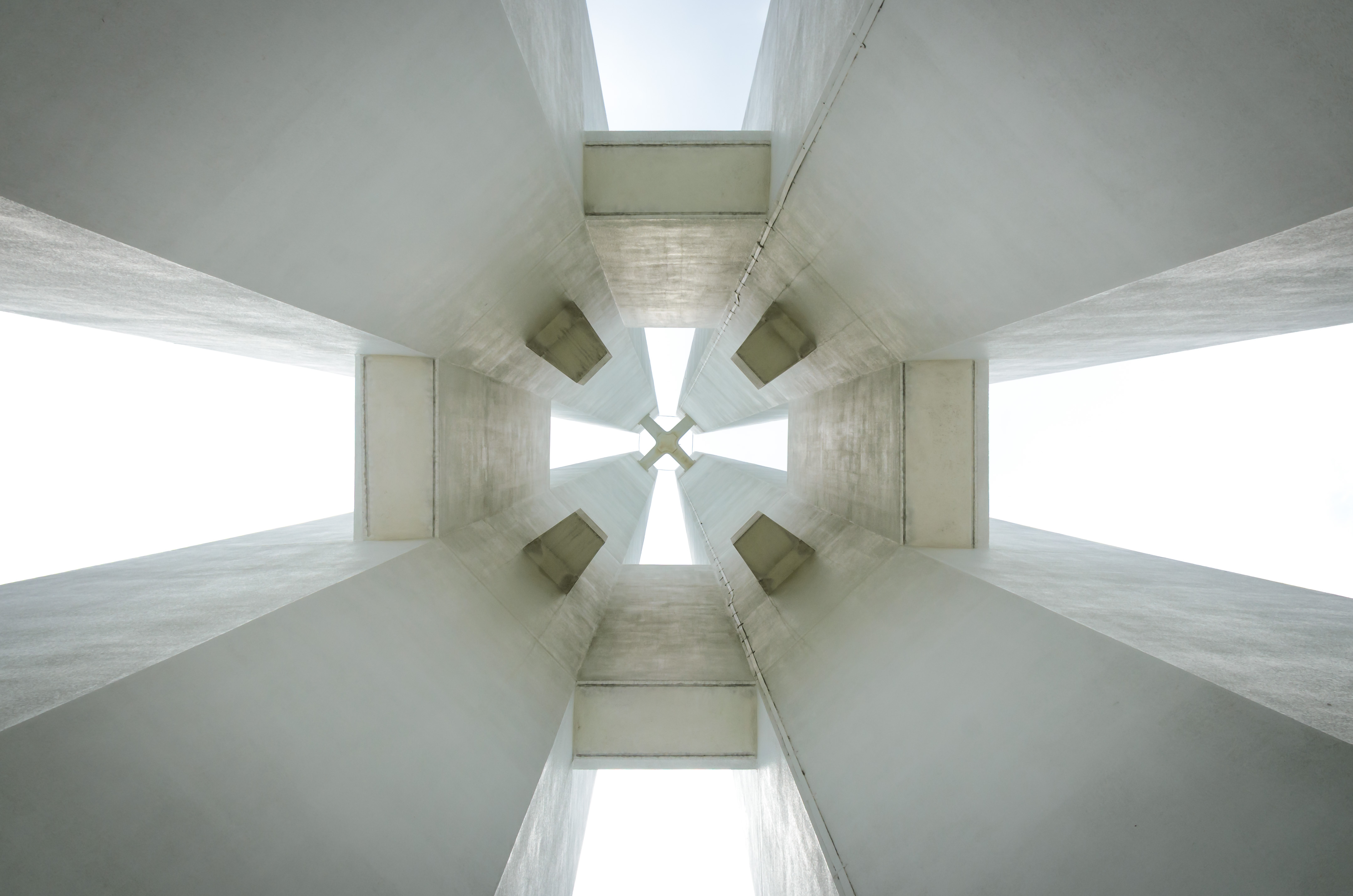
Taken from the centre of the memorial upwards, resulting in a cross-like shape

== See also ==
- Battle of Singapore
- History of Singapore
- Former Indian National Army Monument
- Kranji War Memorial
- Lim Bo Seng Memorial
- Monument to the People's Heroes (Shanghai), a monument with architectural similarities
- The Cenotaph, Singapore
