= Whole-of-Society Defense Resilience Committee =

Taiwanese organization

The Whole-of-Society Defense Resilience Committee is a Taiwanese organization created to organize and standardize defense efforts across Taiwan taking a whole-of-society approach to the problem.

== Purpose ==
The primary focus of the Whole-of-Society Defense Resilience Committee is organizing a whole-of-society defense against natural and man-made disasters. According to the Brookings Institution "The whole-of-society resilience (WOSR) effort is a substantial part of Taiwan’s overall approach to defense and deterrence."

== History ==
Whole of society resiliance as a core part of Taiwan's national security strategy was advocated by Admiral Lee Hsi-ming during his time in command and after.

The Whole-of-Society Defense Resilience Committee was inaugurated in 2024 with the purpose of organizing and standardizing civil defense efforts across Taiwan taking a whole-of-society approach to the problem. The committee held their first tabletop exercise in December 2024 and their first physical exercise in March 2025. The March exercise involved 1,500 people and was overseen by Taiwanese President William Lai.

== See also ==
- Civil defense in Taiwan
- Total Defence (Singapore)
- All-Out Defense Mobilization Agency
