= Tang Chia-kun =

Taiwanese general officer

- 湯家坤
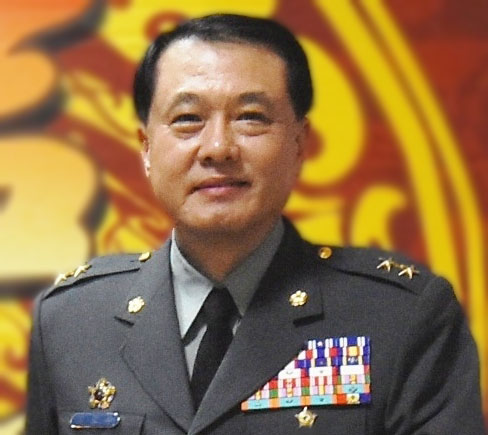

35th Commander of the Armed Force Reserve
- Incumbent
- Assumed office 2015
- Preceded by: Fu Jheng-cheng

6th Commander of the Kinmen Defense Command
- In office August 16, 2014 – June 30, 2015
- Preceded by: Pan Jia-yu
- Succeeded by: Hao Yi-zhi

14th Director of the Military Intelligence Bureau
- In office October 10, 2011 – August 15, 2013
- Preceded by: Zhang Kan-ping
- Succeeded by: Liu De-liang

Personal details
- Education: Republic of China Military Academy

Military service
- Allegiance: Republic of China
- Branch/service: Republic of China Army
- Rank: Lieutenant General

Lieutenant General Tang Chia-kun (Chinese: 湯家坤) is a Republic of China Army Lieutenant General who currently serves as the 35th Commander of the Armed Force Reserve since 2023. Prior to his appointment, he served as the 14th Director of the Military Intelligence Bureau from October 2011 to August 2013.

== Early life and education ==
He was born in Taiwan, and graduated from Republic of China Military Academy at age 18 in Class 45.

== Military career ==
After graduating from the military academy, he was commissioned as a Second Lieutenant in Armed Forces Reserve.

In 2014, he served as the commander of the Kinmen Defense Command. In 2015, he was replaced by Hao Yi Zhi, 7th commander of the Kinmen Defense Command.

Since 2015, he has been the Commander of the Armed Forces Reserve, after replacing Fu Jheng-cheng.
