= Whole-of-government approach =

Working practice in public administration

A whole-of-government approach (WGA) refers to the joint activities performed by diverse ministries, public administrations and public agencies in order to provide a common solution to particular problems or issues, and involve some form of cross-boundary work and restructuring.

== Description ==
The approach and content of the initiatives can be formal or informal. Areas covered can be related to policy development, public project management or public services.

Structural reforms performed within public administrations during the past decades have introduced this new methodology which aims to reflect individual government's global policy and priorities through the improvement and coordination of services. WGA also seeks to introduce coherence in the decision-making process of public administrations.

Another outgrowth of WGA is the whole-of-nation approach (WNA), which is gaining ascendancy as a holistic theory of public administration in helping to tackle key national and global issues. Unlike WGA, WNA is more comprehensive as an approach to governance that also takes into account actors and players which are not associated with the state.

== Background ==
The first reference to this operational approach is found in Tony Blair's administration in the United Kingdom. It was then referred to as Joined-Up-Government ("JG"). By means of this methodology the government tried to overcome the existing problem of departmentalism within the rigid structures of public institutions, hampering the use of existing resources and incentives. Departmentalism leads to complex procedures in order to deliver desired policy outcomes.

Policy reforms implemented within the administration were based on the principle that traditional processes, independent in each government department or public institution, is built according to past reforms, but is also a reflection of past failures.

Nowadays, several internal and external issues justify the coordination among different public administrations:

a) External issues:

Pressures from public opinion, budgetary constraints, security, counterterrorism and environmental impact are some examples of the limitations imposed by external factors. These issues show a growing complexity of social problems and demand meaningful experiences in diverse areas, reflective knowledge and strategic answers to provide solutions.

b) Internal issues:

Aligning common interests, avoiding task duplications, reducing costs, increasing productivity and achieving a coherent line of action, in order to provide desired results, are some elements that stimulate the improvement of vertical and horizontal coordination of different government departments and public institutions.

== Description ==
Although there are many perspectives of whole-of-government (WOG), the most accepted definition is WOG as a concept that emphasizes the need for greater collaboration and coordination across departmental boundaries to eliminate duplication, optimize resources, create synergies among agencies, and deliver seamless services to the citizens and businesses. WOG is increasingly seen as an imperative mechanism for delivering coherent and integrated policies including effective alignment of top-down policies. Furthermore, WOG creates comprehensive shared resources and established seamless services, encompasses communication, information sharing and decision-making processes. This requires cross-boundary government structure to build the reciprocal cooperation between government agencies that respond to the needs, capabilities, and limitations of organization in all levels.

A few countries have adopted WOG as a central part of public sector reform. Meanwhile, some other countries strongly emphasize on the integrated service delivery driven by WOG policy. In this case, WOG concept is used as formal guidance for policymakers. Nonetheless, in light of increasing research and academic interest of WOG, it is clear that the global significance of this concept is on an upward trend. WOG is needed to simplify and integrate e-government services with a focus on quality improvement through the connected government. WOG collaboration requires agencies to make their vertical organizational structures visible. Through WOG, decision-making processes can be made in a central point for all agencies to help eliminate duplication, monitor on-going collaborations and serve as an institutional unit to embark on the collaborative strategies.

Studies have highlighted some benefits of implementing WOG. Some of the salient points are optimizing outcomes with extensive collaboration to deliver services that are tailored made to citizens and business's needs, simplifying processes by coordinating the needs of the public authorities involved, reducing duplication and integrating services, eliminating the bureaucratic model and fragmented services to allow more integrated approach, breaking the information 'silos' that are created by departmentalism and lack of coordination, nurturing partnerships with various agencies for delivering seamless government services, and on supplanting the vertical sectoral boundaries of traditional bureaucracy with collaborative structures. These studies focus on the non-technical elements ranging from the strategic management, planning, and business process realignment as well as coordination efforts towards the establishment of integrated services.

Other studies mention about the technical factors to support the success of WOG initiative. The factors include standardization of requirements in the implementation of integration processes, interoperability, big data. and security. Meanwhile, the United Nations Department of Economic and Social Affairs (UNDESA) has outlined WoG characteristics as the key contributors to E-government development. These characteristics are structured as dimensions with multidimensional constructs. The dimensions include citizen centricity, common infrastructure and interoperability, collaborative services, governance, networked organizational model, social inclusion as well as transparent and open government.

== Methodology ==
On a national stage, the methodology of a WGA challenges the established regulation and political context of any given country. Governmental structures were originally designed for agencies and ministries working and approaching issues individually. The challenge is to develop new legal supportive structures for shared frameworks.

Cooperative structures develop as a result of collaboration rather than through hierarchic pressures, thus coordination goals can be achieved by soft and systematic techniques, with a higher degree of consideration on pragmatic interaction before formal interaction. This has been the case of public administrations in Canada, where horizontal collaboration has been encouraged through internal communication of "Best Practices" and "Lessons Learned" of selected projects.

Nevertheless, in order to achieve a successful WGA, results are also necessary on the vertical array, where voluntary collaboration is constrained as each actor is part of a definite hierarchical configuration. In this case, a centralized element of leadership is necessary to coordinate the agenda and to supervise principles and policies that need to be accomplished.

The methodology of the Australian government, to perform projects with a WGA, builds within a simple framework of a shared definition of top-down goals, in order to align the interests of the various departments involved. Moreover, each department works internally in order to attain the accorded objectives.

Issue	Actions
1. Alignment of interests	Description of desired final results
2. Harmonization of interdepartmental cultural differences	Arrangement of intermediate objectives and results
3. Human Resources requirements	Specification of all services to be provided in order to complete necessary tasks
4. Financial requirements	Definition of actual departments and agencies to be involved and their degree of involvement

Ongoing efforts have to be measurable and regularly assessed. Metric indicators are needed in order to measure the development and the success/failure of any project.

== WGA on international cooperation issues ==
One of the main functions of a WGA, in the international arena, relates to intergovernmental coordination towards the assistance provided to fragile states. A growing international concern towards terrorism and other security issues after the attacks on September 11 and the military interventions in Afghanistan and Iraq, together with reiterative downfalls of some unstable states that where left alone to providence, have led into unexpected consequences within the international arena:

- Many limitations of traditional military and diplomatic interventions have been uncovered.
- There is a general agreement towards the need for a greater impetus from developed governments, to come up with viable formulas towards the progress and well-being of fragile states, due to these nations’ specific deprived conditions and risks.

Research conducted in this direction highlights the contributions that WGA can bring, towards the achievement of long-term development and stability to fragile states at a lower cost. Moreover, the application of this methodology may reduce the risk of failure to meeting planned objectives.

== See also ==
- Whole-of-society
