= All-Out Defense Mobilization Agency =

Government agency in Taiwan

All-Out Defense Mobilization Agency, MND
- 國防部全民防衛動員署
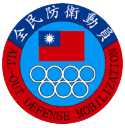

Agency overview
- Formed: 1 January 2022
- Jurisdiction: Republic of China
- Headquarters: Zhongzheng District, Taipei
- Parent agency: Ministry of National Defense

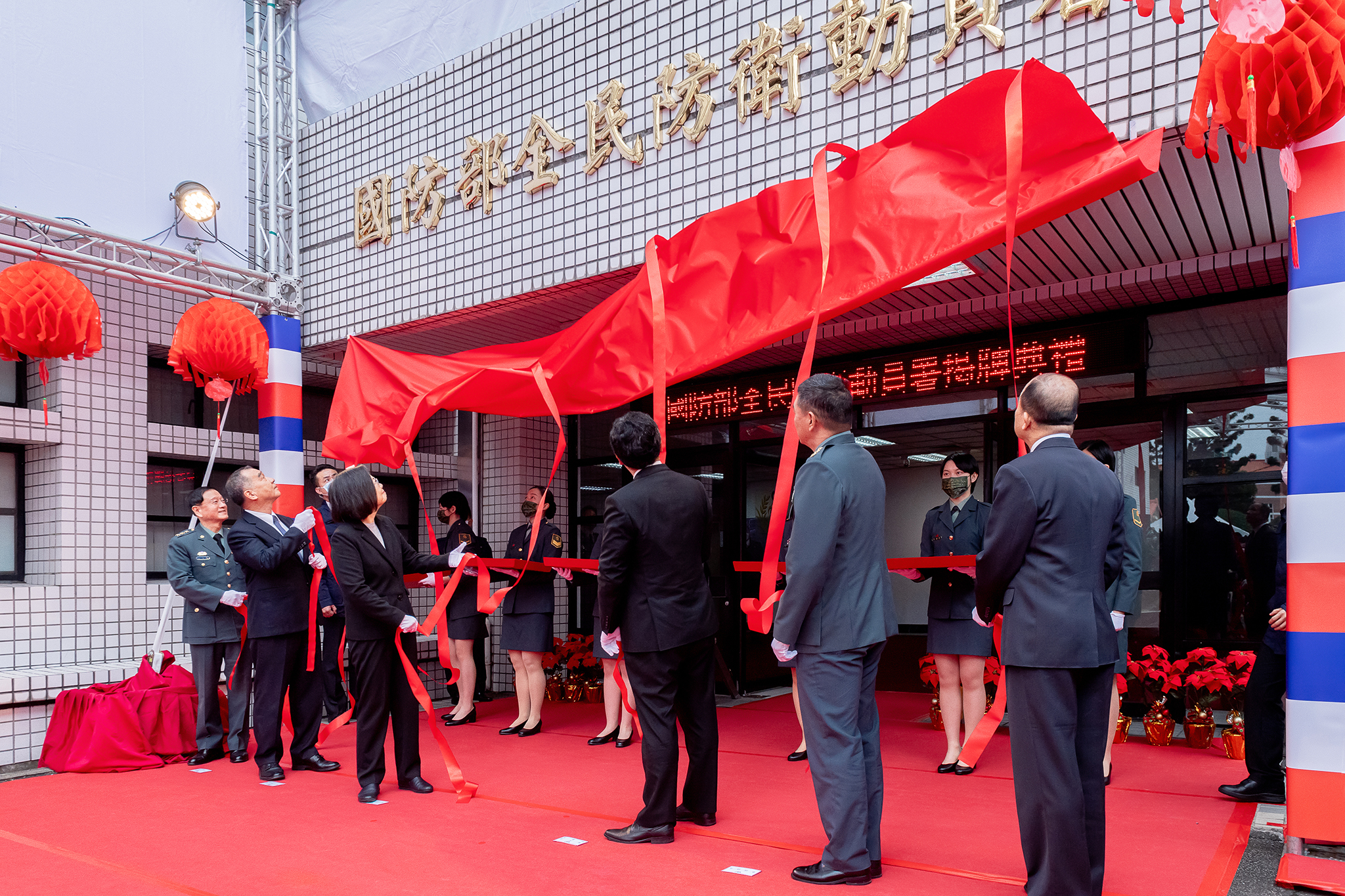

The All-Out Defense Mobilization Agency (Chinese: 國防部全民防衛動員署) is the reserve mobilization agency of Taiwan.

== History ==
In May 2021 the Legislative Yuan passed legislation which authorized the All-Out Defense Mobilization Agency.

The agency was inaugurated on December 30 2021 with an official launch date of January 1, 2022. It was created through the merger of the All-out Defense Mobilization Office and the Armed Forces Reserve Command.

The Agency published an updated civil defense handbook in 2023. On September 16, 2025, it also published In Case of Crisis: Taiwan’s National Public Safety Guide 2025, a new “Civilian Defense Handbook” providing Taiwan residents with information about what to do in the event of war, earthquakes, and other emergencies. As part of this effort, they also launched a new website - prepare.mnd.gov.tw - that offered additional information and both the Chinese language and English language versions of the handbook.

== Purpose ==
The agency was established to enhance Taiwan's ability to deter a Chinese invasion through asymmetric means.

== Organization ==
- Manpower Mobilization Division
- Materials Mobilization Division
- Mobilization Management Division
- Mobilization Integration Division

=== Affiliated troops ===
- Armed Forces Reserve Command

== See also ==
- Civil defense in Taiwan
- Total defence
- Whole-of-Society Defense Resilience Committee
