= Yang Jing-se =

Yang Jing-se Arthur Young
- 楊靜瑟

MIB Director
- Incumbent
- Assumed office 2022/03/01
- Preceded by: Luo Der-min

Deputy Chief of the General Staff for Intelligence
- In office 2020/08–2022/02/23

Personal details
- Born: Unknown
- Education: Republic of China Air Force Academy (BS); National Chengchi University (MA); National Defense University (MS)
- Occupation: air force officer

Military service
- Allegiance: Republic of China
- Branch/service: Republic of China Air Force (Taiwan)
- Rank: Lieutenant General

Yang Jing-se (Chinese: 楊靜瑟), also known as Arthur Young, is a Lieutenant General of the Air Force of Taiwan (ROCAF). On February 23, 2022, he succeeded his predecessor, Luo Der-min, and was appointed as the Director of Military Intelligence Bureau. Served from March 1.

== Education ==
Yang is a 1987 graduate of the Republic of China Air Force Academy (CAFA), finished senior staff courses at the Air Command & Staff College, National Defense University (NDU) in 2001, then NDU War College in 2008. In 2008 he also graduate with master degree majoring in strategy and international affairs from the Department of Diplomacy, National Chengchi University (NCCU), with his thesis studying the influence of Japan's newly-developed fighter jets on the strength of East Asian air forces (論日本發展新型戰機對東亞空軍戰力影響之研究).

== Air force service ==
Yang was commissioned as an air force officer in 1987 upon graduation from the academy. In 1996, France sold 60 Mirage 2000s to Taiwan. Lieutenant Colonel Shen Yiming led the team to Dijon Air Force Base, France. Yang was one of the first 8 Taiwanese pilots to go to secret training. Pilot training in the French military ended on 1 May 1997.

During the years of Ma Ying-jeou's administration, the Mirage fighter crashed in a routine training exercise in 2013. Yang was in charge of the maintenance as the political and warfare director of the 499th Tactical Fighter Wing of the Air Force. He initially judged that it was a system failure.

December 1, 2018, Yang assumed post as Superintendent of the Air Force Academy and served until July 31, 2020. Since August, Yang took over as the Deputy Chief of the General Staff for Intelligence (DCGS/Intelligence) of the Ministry of National Defense, and was promoted to Lieutenant General of the Air Force in December.

On February 23, 2022, the General Staff Headquarters announced that Yang Jingse replaced Luo Der-Min as Director of the Military Intelligence Bureau, and took office on March 1.

== See also ==
- List of Mirage 2000 fighter crashes of Taiwan
