= Jincheng Civil Defense Tunnel =

Tunnel in Jincheng, Kinmen, Taiwan

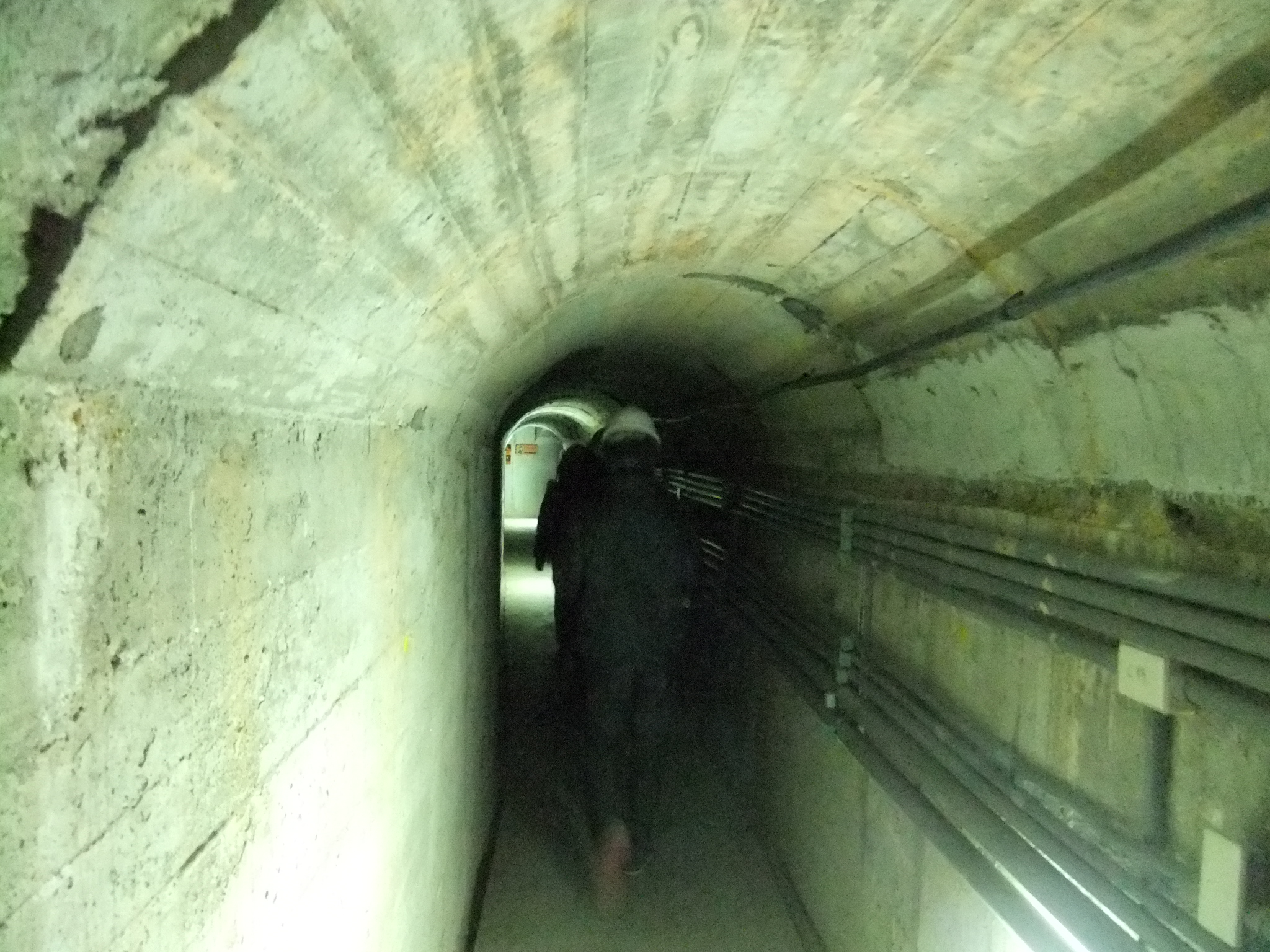
- Interactive map of Jincheng Civil Defense Tunnel

Overview
- Official name: 金城民防坑道
- Location: Jincheng, Kinmen, Taiwan
- Coordinates: 24°25′59.0″N 118°19′12.8″E
- Status: Heritage

Operation
- Work began: March 1968
- Opened: June 1969

Technical
- Length: 2,315 m (7,595 ft)

The Jincheng Civil Defense Tunnel (Chinese: 金城民防坑道; pinyin: Jīnchéng Mínfáng Kēngdào) is a tunnel in Jincheng Township, Kinmen County, Taiwan.

== History ==
After the first and second Taiwan Strait Crisis, the government decided to construct an underground civilian tunnels for protection. The construction of the tunnel started in March 1968 and completed in June 1969 for 15 months of works. It was then used to connect various public buildings in the island.

== Architecture ==
The tunnel has a total combined length of 2,315 meters. It is equipped with air raid shelters, ammunition depots and pillboxes.

== See also ==
- List of tourist attractions in Taiwan
