= Whole-of-society =

Concept in international relations

Whole-of-society, or Whole of society, is a concept in international relations and related fields which looks to engage diverse groups across society to further common policy goals.

== Definition ==
According to the United Nations Educational, Scientific and Cultural Organization "A whole-of-society approach embraces both formal and informal institutions in seeking a generalized agreement across society about policy goals and the means to achieve them."

== History ==
The term first appeared in a 2010 paper published by the Asia-Pacific Center for Security Studies.

The European Union has explored a whole-of-society approach to countering hybrid warfare.

The Taiwanese Whole-of-Society Defense Resilience Committee was inaugurated in 2024. The committee's purpose is to organize and standardize civil defense efforts across Taiwan. According to the Brookings Institution "The whole-of-society resilience (WOSR) effort is a substantial part of Taiwan’s overall approach to defense and deterrence."

== See also ==
- Primary health care
- Whole-of-government approach
- Total Defence (Singapore)
- Total defence
- Civil society
