= Republic of China Armed Forces Reserve =

Republic of China Armed Forces Reserve Command
- 國防部後備指揮部
- Emblem of the Republic of China Armed Forces Reserve Command
- Founded: 1945; 81 years ago
- Country: Republic of China
- Branch: Ministry of National Defence
- Type: Military reserve
- Size: 6,100 (peacetime)
- Part of: Republic of China Armed Forces

Commanders
- Commander: Army Lieutenant General Tang Chia-kun
- Deputy Commander: Army Major General Chen Chia-shang
- Chief of staff: Army Major General Lee Shih-kuo

Insignia
- Flag

The Republic of China Armed Forces Reserve (Chinese: 國防部後備指揮部; pinyin: Guófáng bù hòubèi zhǐhuī bù) is a military reserve division of the All-Out Defense Mobilization Agency tasked with managing, planning, and mobilizing the reserve potential of Taiwan.

It aimed to provide the first line of coastal defence and wartime operations through its reserve forces, and to sustain military mobilization to support ground operations, maintenance, and homeland security. Another major role of the Reserve Command was the recruitment, education, and training of effective reserve forces.

== Overview ==
The Reserve Command has both peacetime and wartime responsibilities. During peacetime the Reserve Command manages the combined service reserve system, organizes and trains reserve units, recruits new talent, and prepares, certifies, and executes mobilization plans.

The Reserve Command also assists the regular forces with humanitarian and disaster relief work. The Reserve Command’s primary wartime responsibility is providing mobilized reserve brigades to operational commanders. The secondary responsibility is effecting comprehensive national mobilization, which is made up of both military and civilian mobilization.

The Reserve Command’s forces provide a critical second line of defense against a People’s Republic of China invasion. The division of responsibilities between the regular and reserve forces is guided by the principle that in the event of wartime their missions will be “regular forces conducting strikes and the reserve forces defending the territory.”

== History ==
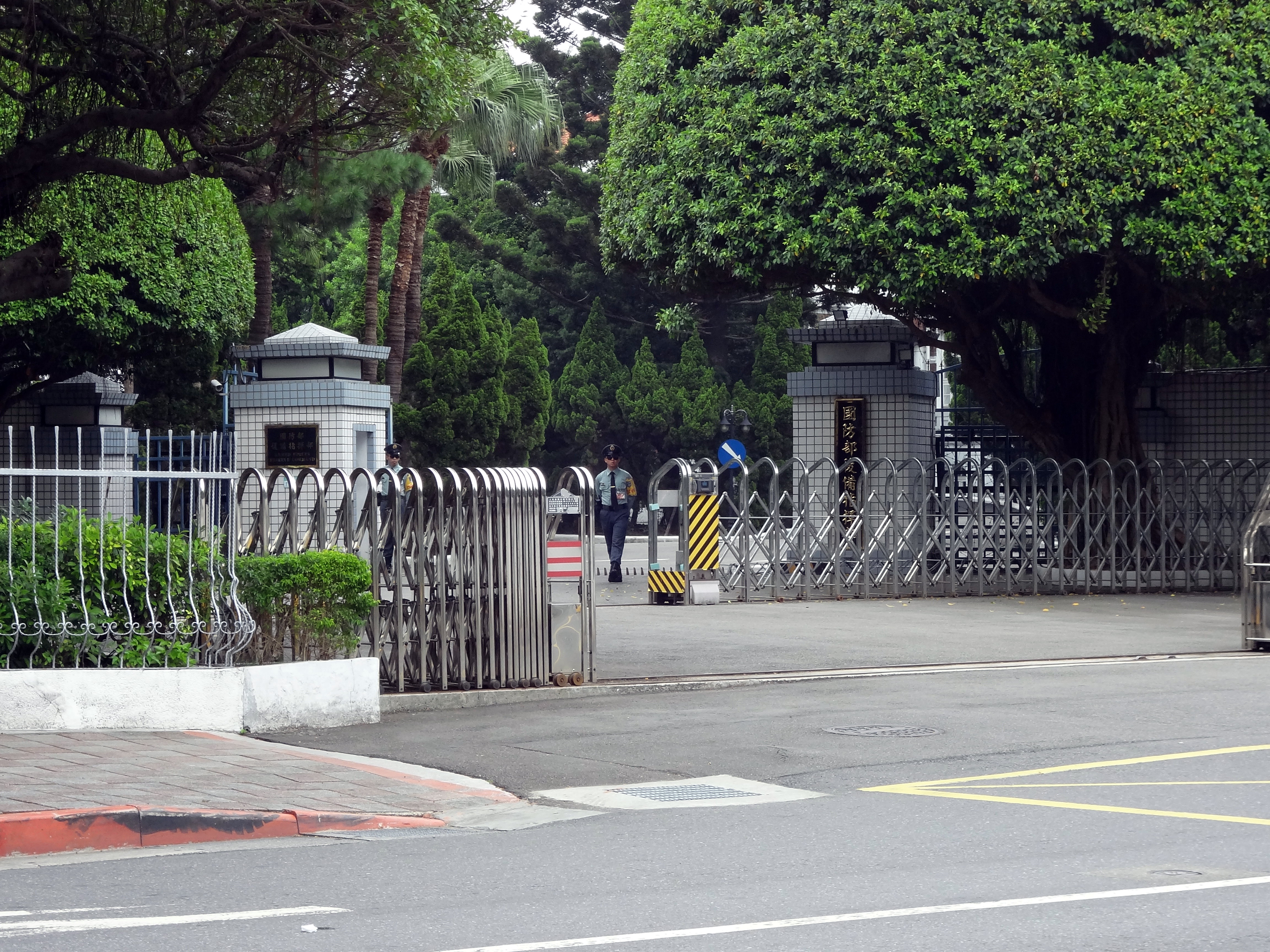
Armed Forces Reserve Command

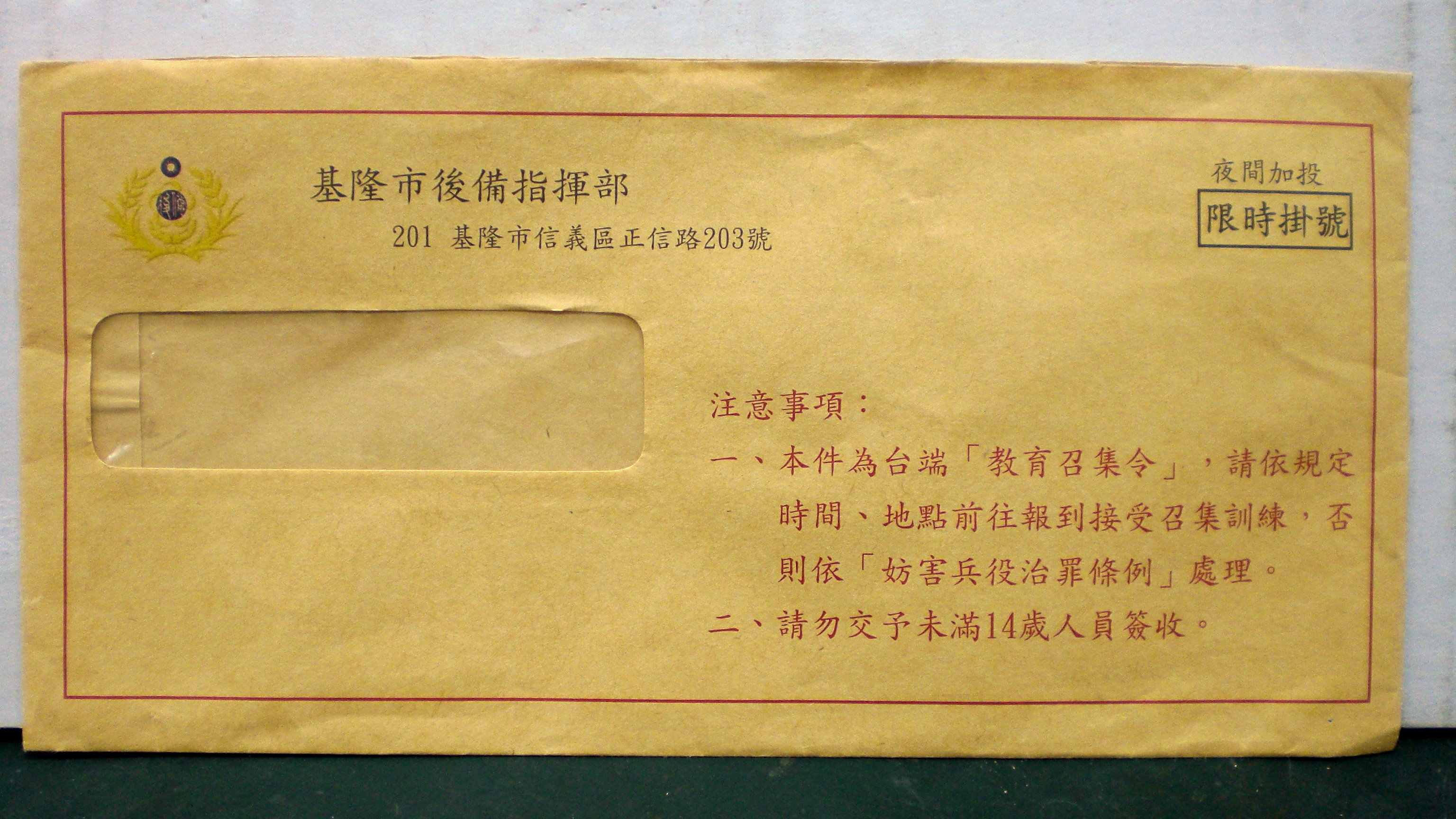
Keelung City Reserve Command General summoned envelope

"Reserve Command" is a historical heritage bears military units. Thirty-four years since the Republic of China (1945) September 1 in Chongqing set up a "Taiwan Garrison General Headquarters' cases; the main task is responsible for Japanese emperor defeat repatriation in Taiwan and Japan prisoners, the reception of Taiwan and Taiwan maintain law and order issues.

- 1947, was ordered to be changed to "Taiwan province garrison headquarters". Peng Meng Ji served as commander in chief with Taipei as HQ.
- In early 1949, the Taiwan Garrison General Headquarters of the province was renamed "Taiwan Garrison General Headquarters".
- Fall 1949 - the garrison headquarters ordered the "Southeast Military Executive Office" and "Taiwan Security Command" be raised on the basis of the Taiwan Province command. Peng Meng Ji was appointed security commander.
- May 1958, in order to streamline the organization and unity of command, Army General Command business will be transferred to the garrison headquarters martial newly established, will "Taiwan's defense headquarters", "Taiwan Province Security Command "," civil defense headquarters four units in Taiwan Province "and" Xu Wei Taipei headquarters, "so as to" Taiwan Provincial Security Command "Merge compiled based on" Taiwan Garrison Command ". Xu Wei 黃鎮球 was named Taiwan garrison commander.
- July 1, 1964, to adjust the reserve military mobilization system, Defense Department abolition of Mobilization, New establishment "military district headquarters in Taiwan," Taiwan military district commander from Taiwan garrison commander concurrently, Secretary authorities have both high rank Sui Wei "Taiwan Garrison Command, the Taiwan military district headquarters".
- 1977 "Jing'an the 1st" Project, military police Command former garrison headquarters in North Carolina knitting, central and southern three garrison battalions of military police battalion 239 ~ 241.
- August 1, 1992, in response to the 1992 Consensus, a reorganization of the military police, army, and marines occurred. The Taiwan military district headquarters - Coast Guard Command was formed to replace the originally police-led coast guard. The Coast Guard Command's roles include anti-smuggling, and immigration enforcement. On November 1, Taiwan military district headquarter was renamed to Military district headquarters. This unit is directly under the General Staff Headquarters, not belonging to the Armed Forces.
- 1999, because of the needs of port security, Military Police Battalions 224, and 241 were relocated.
- January 2000, the third reading "three methods of the Coast Guard", the same year on February 1 Japanese pipe, Coast Guard division. After Coast Guard was established, namely to command the full title " military district headquarters ." In history, the military garrison tube portion inherited historical headquarters since the Coast Guard is to be treated as a new Judicial Police units.
- March 1, 2002 with the National Defense Law of Taiwan implementation of full military control section title amended to Department of Defense Reserve Command , the regional "divisions tube section," counties "group tube unit "are amended to" Reserve Command. "
- January 1, 2006 Joint Logistics Department and stay around to your business stay business (center), demonstration Martyrs Cemetery Administration and Management Group shift compiled Reserve Command. February 15, all regions and all cities and counties "Reserve Command" amended to "reserve headquarters", "commander" was renamed the "commander."
- November 2008 in accordance with 精進案 plan, rank of commander was downgraded from full general to lieutenant general.
- 28 December 2012 in response to 精粹案, and with the Ministry of National Defense organizational changes, reducing the Armed Forces Reserve to the Department of Defense Reserve Command. The recruit training center shift compiled Army reserve brigade; reserve brigade is shifting series Navy, set up Marines recruit training center. Reserve Command is responsible for recruit training and counseling services also was terminated in favor of the mobilization and reserve forces responsible for management of the main business.
- January 1, 2022, Armed Forced Reserve Command was assigned to All-Out Defense Mobilization Agency of the Ministry of National Defense. Its title therefore became “Armed Forces Reserve Command, All-Out Defense Mobilization Agency of the Ministry of National Defense”. The main duty of the Command is to implement reserve affairs including mobilization, management, service and civil defense work to reserve reservists’ potential.

== Force structure ==
=== Reserve Command headquarters ===
- General Staff office: responsible for personnel, readiness, logistics, mobilization, planning, and funerary services.
- Political Warfare office: responsible for comprehensive political warfare, propaganda and psychological warfare, defense and security, and military awards.
- Inspection office: responsible for military discipline inspection, supervision and standards development, and legal affairs.
- Subordinate Units office: including as components the Department Guards Company, medical component, the Reserve Mobilization Management Academy, the National Heroes Cemetery Management Component, the National People’s Revolution Tomb of Unknowns Management Component, and the Funeral Services Section’s Tomb of the Unknowns Management Component.

=== General Coordination Organizations of All-Out Defense Capabilities ===
The General Coordination Organizations of All-Out Defense Capabilities is a peacetime mechanism for coordinating reserve and total defense activities. It is organized at the city/county, combat zone, and national level.

== Equipment ==
Dual-use civilian assets in the reserve system include 10,000 properties, 2,000 pieces of heavy machinery, 300 fishing boats, 60 aircraft, and 50 ships.

=== Regional reserve commands ===
- Northern Area Reserve Command

  - Keelung City Reserve Brigade
  - Taipei City Reserve Brigade
  - New Taipei City Reserve Brigade
  - Taoyuan City Reserve Brigade
  - Hsinchu Reserve Brigade
  - Yilan County Reserve Brigade
  - Hualien County Reserve Brigade
  - Lianjiang County Reserve Brigade
  - Northern Region First Reserve Force Training Center

- Central Area Reserve Command

  - Miaoli County Reserve Brigade
  - Taichung City Reserve First Brigade
  - Taichung City Reserve Second Brigade
  - Changhua County Reserve Brigade
  - Nantou County Reserve Brigade
  - Yunlin County Reserve Brigade
  - Chiayi Reserve Brigade
  - Central Region Reserve Forces Training Center

- Southern Area Reserve Command

  - Tainan City Reserve Brigade
  - Kaohsiung City Reserve First Brigade
  - Kaohsiung City Reserve Second Brigade
  - Pingtung County Reserve Brigade
  - Taitung County Reserve Brigade
  - Penghu County Reserve Brigade
  - Kinmen County Reserve Brigade
  - Southern Region Reserve Forces Training Center

- 24 Reserve brigades (Activated only in time of war)

== Flags ==
Flag of the Commander Reserve Forces
