= Director of the Military Intelligence Bureau =

Director of Military Intelligence Bureau
- Incumbent; Yang Jing-se since 2022-03-01
- Residence: No. 74, Ln. 62, Sec. 1, Zhicheng Rd., Shilin Dist., Taipei City, Taiwan
- Inaugural holder: Lu Guang Yi
- Formation: 1985
- Deputy: Deputy Director
- Website: N/A

Director of the Military Intelligence Bureau is the head of the Military Intelligence Bureau, which is a Taiwanese intelligence agency.

== Military Intelligence Bureau directors (1985-present) ==
Name	Image	Term of office	Military rank
Lu Guang Yi 盧光義		1985/7/1-1987/8/31	（Lieutenant General, Artillery Section）
Huang Shi Zhong 黄世忠		1987/9/1-1989/12/4	（Army lieutenant general）
Yin Zongwen 殷宗文		1989/12/5-1993/5/31	（Army second-ranking general）
Hu Jiaqi 胡家麒		1993/6/1-1998/1/31	（Army lieutenant general）
Ding Yuzhou 丁渝洲		1998/2/1-1999/1/31	（Army second-ranking general）
Xu Zhu-sheng 徐筑生		1999/2/1-2001/8/10	（Vice Admiral）
Xue Shi-min 薛石民		2001/8-2003/8	（Army second-ranking general）
Debert 戴伯特		2003/9/1-2004/5/19	（Army second-ranking general）
Yu Lianfa 余連發		2004/6/1-2005/6	（Army second-ranking general）
Peng Sheng-chu 彭勝竹		2005/6-2006/4	（Air Force Lieutenant）
Shen Shiji 沈世籍		2006/4-2008/3	（Lieutenant General, Military Police Section）
Ge Guangming 葛廣明		2008/3-2009/10/2	（Air Force Lieutenant General, jailed for corruption）
Zhang Kanping 張戡平		2009/10/2-2011/10/30	（Army lieutenant general）
Tang Jiakun 湯家坤		2011/10/30-2013/8/15	（Army lieutenant general）
Liu De-liang 劉德良		2013/8/15-2018/6/30	（Army lieutenant general）
Luo Der-min 羅德民		2018/7/1-2022/2/28	（Army lieutenant general）
Yang Jing-se 楊靜瑟		2022/3/1-present	（Air force lieutenant general）

== See also ==
- United States
  - Director of the Federal Bureau of Investigation
  - Director of the Central Intelligence Agency
  - Director of the Defense Intelligence Agency
- Hong Kong
  - Commissioner of Police
