= War Memorial Park, Singapore =

Memorial park in Singapore

War Memorial Park
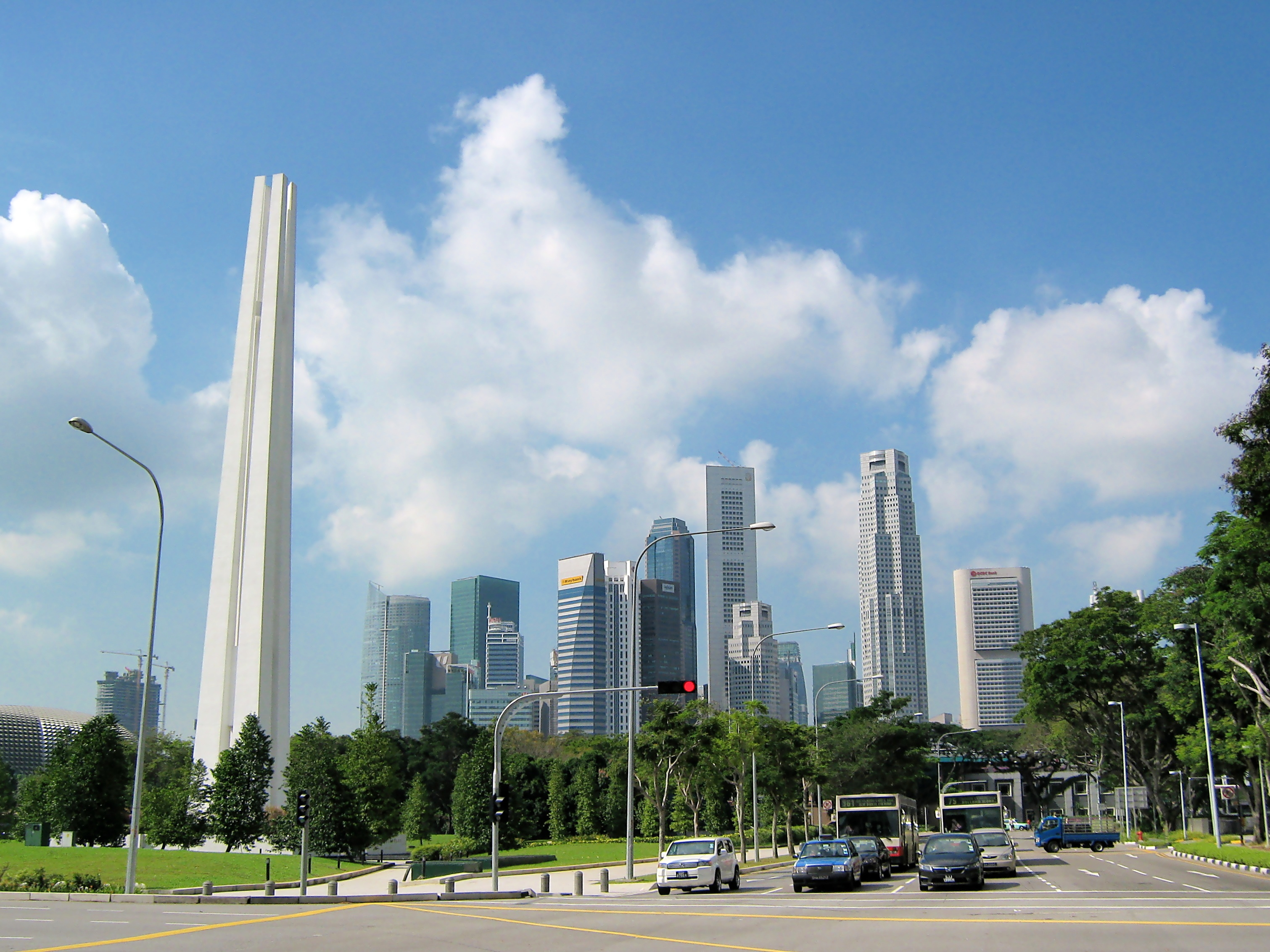
- War Memorial Park

- Location within Singapore
- Type: memorial park
- Location: Singapore
- Coordinates: 1°17′34.5″N 103°51′17.4″E
- Area: 1.4 hectares (14,000 m^{2})
- Authorized: Singapore Government
- Opened: 15 February 1967; 59 years ago
- Manager: National Parks Board
- Status: Open

War Memorial Park is a park in Singapore, located at the junctions of Beach Road, Stamford Road, Nicoll Highway and Bras Basah Road in the Downtown Core of Singapore's Central Region next to Esplanade MRT station. The Civilian War Memorial is located at the center of the park as a memorial to civilians who died in the Japanese occupation of Singapore during World War II. It is managed by the National Parks Board.

== History ==
During the Sook Ching massacre that occurred in Singapore during World War II, mass war graves were dug to contain the bodies of civilians who were killed by the Japanese. When the bodies were unearthed in 1962 in various places, the Singapore Chinese Chamber of Commerce and Industry (SCCCI) decided to gather the remains and create a memorial for them.

On 15 June 1963, in a monumental ceremony attended by VIPs, inter-religious organisations, community leaders and many others, the then Prime Minister officiated at the launch of the Civilian War Memorial project ceremony. The project was completed and the monument was unveiled on 15 February 1967 in conjunction with the 25th anniversary of the Fall of Singapore.

The monument was named the Civilian War Memorial.

== Park ==
The park with the Civilian War Memorial is a popular sightseeing venue among tourists and locals.

== See also ==
- List of Parks in Singapore
- National Parks Board
